= Moral equality of combatants =

Principle in military ethics and international humanitarian law

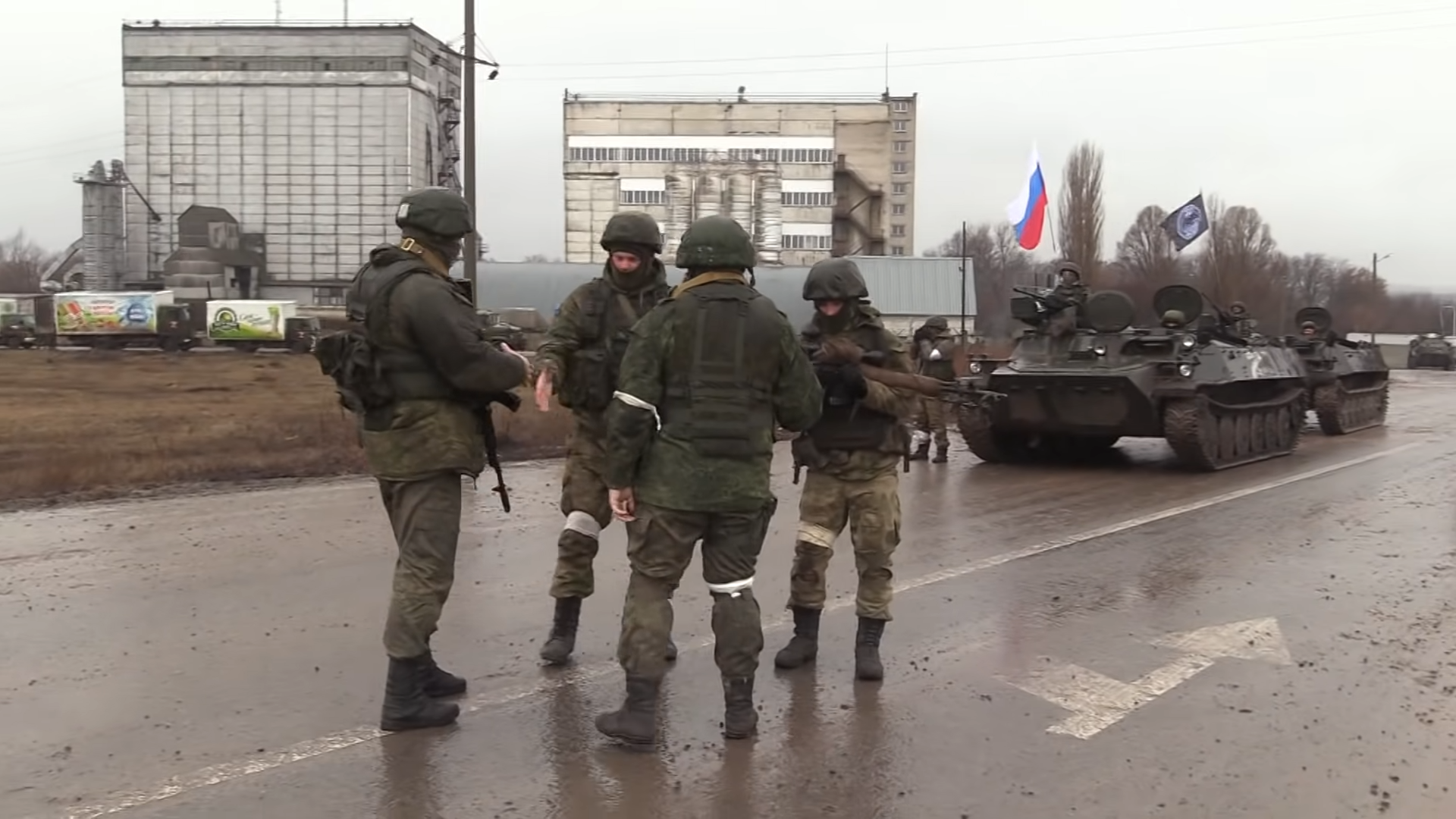
The moral equality of combatants has been cited in relation to the 2022 Russian invasion of Ukraine. Opponents of MEC argue that soldiers who fight a war of aggression, such as these Russian soldiers in Ukraine, are in the wrong.

The moral equality of combatants (MEC) or moral equality of soldiers is the principle that soldiers fighting on both sides of a war are equally honorable, unless they commit war crimes, regardless of whether they fight for a just cause. MEC is a key element underpinning international humanitarian law (IHL)—which applies the rules of war equally to both sides—and traditional just war theory. According to philosopher Henrik Syse, MEC presents a serious quandary because "it makes as little practical sense to ascribe blame to individual soldiers for the cause of the war in which they fight as it makes theoretical sense to hold the fighters on the two sides to be fully morally equal". The moral equality of combatants has been cited in relation to the Israeli–Palestinian conflict or the U.S.-led wars in Iraq and Afghanistan.

== Traditional view ==
MEC as a formal doctrine was articulated in Just and Unjust Wars (1977) by Michael Walzer, although earlier just war theorists such as Augustine and Aquinas argued that soldiers should obey their leaders when fighting. There is dispute over whether early modern just war theory promoted MEC. A full crystallization of MEC could only occur after both jus ad bellum and jus in bello were developed. Proponents of MEC argue that individual soldiers are not well-placed to determine the justness of a war. Walzer, for example, argues that the entire responsibility for an unjust war is borne by military and civilian leaders who choose to go to war, rather than individual soldiers who have little say in the matter.

MEC is one of the underpinnings of international humanitarian law (IHL), which applies equally to both sides regardless of the justice of their cause. In IHL, this principle is known as equality of belligerents. This contradicts the legal principle of ex injuria jus non oritur that no one should be able to derive benefit from their illegal action. British jurist Hersch Lauterpacht articulated the pragmatic basis of belligerent equality, stating: "it is impossible to visualize the conduct of hostilities in which one side would be bound by rules of warfare without benefiting from them and the other side would benefit from them without being bound by them". International law scholar Eliav Lieblich states that the moral responsibility of soldiers who participate in unjust wars is "one of the stickiest problems in the ethics of war".

== Revisionist challenge ==
There is no equivalent to MEC in peacetime circumstances. In 2006, philosopher Jeff McMahan began to contest MEC, arguing that soldiers fighting an unjust or illegal war are not morally equal to those fighting in self-defense. Although they do not favor criminal prosecution of individual soldiers who fight in an unjust war, they argue that individual soldiers should assess the legality or morality of the war they are asked to fight, and refuse if it is an illegal or unjust war. According to the revisionist view, a soldier or officer who knows or strongly suspects that their side is fighting an unjust war has a moral obligation not to fight it, unless this would entail capital punishment or some other extreme consequence.

Opponents of MEC—sometimes grouped under the label of revisionist just war theory—nevertheless generally support the belligerent equality principle of IHL on pragmatic grounds. In his 2018 book The Crime of Aggression, Humanity, and the Soldier, law scholar Tom Dannenbaum was one of the first to propose legal reforms based on rejection of MEC. Dannenbaum argued that soldiers who refuse to fight illegal wars should be allowed selective conscientious objection and be accepted as refugees if they have to flee their country. He also argued that soldiers fighting against a war of aggression should be recognized as victims in postwar reparations processes.

== Public opinion ==
A 2019 study found that the majority of Americans endorse the revisionist view on MEC and many are even willing to allow a war crime against noncombatants to go unpunished when committed by soldiers who are fighting a just war. Responding to the study, Walzer cautioned that differently phrased questions might have led to different results.

== Sources ==
- Barry, Christian; Christie, Lars (2018). "The Moral Equality of Combatants". The Oxford Handbook of Ethics of War. Oxford University Press. ISBN 978-0-19-994341-8.
- Bazargan, Saba (2013). "Moral Equality of Combatants". The International Encyclopedia of Ethics. John Wiley & Sons. doi:10.1002/9781444367072.wbiee343. ISBN 9781405186414.
- Fleck, Dieter (2021). "Historical Development and Legal Basis". The Handbook of International Humanitarian Law. Oxford University Press. ISBN 978-0-19-258719-0.
- Sagan, Scott D.; Valentino, Benjamin A. (2019). "Just War and Unjust Soldiers: American Public Opinion on the Moral Equality of Combatants". Ethics & International Affairs. 33 (4): 411–444. doi:10.1017/S0892679419000431. S2CID 213266276.
- Syse, Henrik (2015). "The Moral Equality of Combatants". The Ashgate Research Companion to Military Ethics. Routledge. ISBN 978-1-315-61324-6.
- Walzer, Michael (2019). "On Reciprocity and Practical Morality: A Response to Sagan and Valentino". Ethics & International Affairs. 33 (4): 445–450. doi:10.1017/S0892679419000406. S2CID 214154231.
