= Supreme emergency =

In just war theory, a supreme emergency is a situation where a state faces an existential threat from an aggressor, which scholars like Michael Walzer and John Rawls argue justifies otherwise unjust action.

== Background ==
Be Ye Men of Valour
The speech delivered by Winston Churchill in which supreme emergency is coined

While supreme emergency is a relatively new concept, just war theory, the context in which supreme emergency is discussed, dates back to preclassical philosophers, with evidence suggesting just war traditions existed in ancient Egypt and in ancient India. In most modern conceptions of just war theory, there are two categories that the moral justification of a war are assessed: jus ad bellum or justice before the war and jus in bello or justice during the war. Brian Orend includes a third category, jus post bellum or justice after the war. Supreme emergencies are typically argued to exempt nations from following certain jus in bello requirements.

In his 1940 speech, Be Ye Men of Valour, British prime minister Winston Churchill coined 'supreme emergency' to describe the threat posed by Nazi Germany to the United Kingdom. Churchill used the phrase as rhetorical device to urge the British people to overcome their fear and to suggest that the new threat was more severe than others in the past. Decades later, Michael Walzer analyzed the assumptions underlying Churchill's supreme emergency and posited an exemption from other moral obligations of just war theory, especially an obligation to mitigate harm to non-combatants. This proposed exemption has since become a contentious issue among just war theorists.

== Definition and criteria ==
For a threat to be considered a supreme emergency, Walzer suggests two conditions must be met: the threat must be imminent, and it must be of a more severe nature than ordinary military defeat. Conventional military threats, like military occupation, indemnities or the loss of territorial integrity are, Walzer argues, not severe enough to constitute a supreme emergency exemption, but the exile or murder of a large portion of the population could be.

== Interpretations ==
=== As a justification ===
Walzer's supreme emergency defines the exemption as a justification; Walzer argues that actions like targeting civilians are not violations of just war theory when a supreme emergency is in effect and one is not morally liable for the otherwise morally wrong action of attacking civilians. The supreme emergency is a justification, Walzer argues, because a supreme emergency becomes apparent only after many options have been exhausted, and a "moral urgency" exists when an entire nation is immanently threatened. In such situations, Walzer argues that a statesman would have "moral dirty hands" because he would be obliged to urgently decide between otherwise morally wrong alternatives. John Rawls similarly argues for supreme emergency as a justification, arguing that the threat of genocide undermines well-ordered society, which is the basis of Rawls' universal human rights. As such, Rawls only sees supreme emergency as justification when used by societies which are in compliance with universal human rights; Britain's attacks on civilians early in World War II were justified, but, had the roles been reversed, Germany would not have been justified in similar attacks.

=== As an excuse ===
While Walzer and others have characterized supreme emergencies as a justification, others have argued instead that supreme emergencies are an excuse, mitigating, but not rectifying the wrongness of the action. Brian Orend, for example, has argued that supreme emergencies cannot be used to justify because it allows the state to perform actions which would never be permissible at an interpersonal level, because Walzer's arguments depend on a utilitarian interpretation of war which Orend believes is incompatible with just war theory, and because allowing exemptions to jus in bello requirements for supreme emergencies makes jus in bello subordinate to jus ad bellum. Orend instead argues that in supreme emergency situations, extreme duress excuses decisions for ones own survival. Supreme emergency has also been characterized as a "moral disaster" by Primoratz, arguing that Walzer's dirty hands should be less permissive and more specific.

=== No supreme emergency exemption ===
Michael Schwartz and Debra Comer argue that religious institutions, such as the Church of England, would not accept violations of jus in bello rules for a supreme emergency. This is because there is distinction between acquired rights, which stem from circumstance, and inherent rights, which are inviolable properties of personhood. Schwartz and Comer argue that Walzer incorrectly treated all rights as acquired, allowing rights that biblical ethicists consider inherent to change with circumstance.
