= Lex pacificatoria =

Concept in international relations

The lex pacificatoria is a Latin neologism, which translates as 'pacific law' or the 'law of the peacemakers'; it refers to the law relating to agreements or treaties ending a state of war or establishing a permanent peace between belligerents, as articulated by state and non-state peacemakers, such as peace negotiators. As such, it is a set of normativizing practices, the ‘industry standards’ of peacemakers. In its relationship with traditional legal doctrines such as the jus ad bellum, it is both incorporated in, and shapes, interpretations of binding legal instruments, and it can also be determinative of, or influence, court judgments. The term was popularized by the legal scholar Christine Bell in her 2008 book On the Law of Peace: Peace Agreements and the Lex Pacificatoria. Bell contrasts the notion with the Law of War, stressing that the art of post-war peace deserves as much consideration as the waging of war, and the notion is related to the jus post bellum, the concept of justice after war, with which it has been critiqued.

== Other use of the term ==
Lex Pacificatoria is the name of a peace, justice, and human rights podcast hosted by Michael J. Campbell. The podcast won the 2025 Stories of peace award presented by the Canadian Peace Museum.

The first episode features an interview with Sean Carleton on Canadian residential school denialism. Episode 2 features Jamie Bowman, an international legal consultant, who worked for development aid organizations, including USAID. Episode 3 features Zhanna Galeyeva, who distributed more than $7 million in humanitarian aid to Ukraine since the 2022 Russian invasion of Ukraine.

In 2025, the University of Western Ontario Academy for Advanced Research partnered with the podcast to promote their annual theme of "Exploring Possibilities for Peace in the Twenty-first Century" with an interview of Sabine Nölke, former ambassador of Canada to the Netherlands.

== See also ==
- Christine Bell
- Jus post bellum
- Law of War
- Peace treaty
