= Just and Unjust Wars =

1977 book by Michael Walzer

Just and Unjust Wars: A Moral Argument with Historical Illustrations
- Author: Michael Walzer
- Language: English
- Subject: Just war theory
- Published: 1977 (Basic Books)
- Publication place: United States
- Media type: Print
- ISBN: 071391162X (First Edition); 0465052711 (Fifth Edition)

Just and Unjust Wars: A Moral Argument with Historical Illustrations is a 1977 book by the philosopher Michael Walzer. Published by Basic Books, it is still in print, now as part of the Basic Books Classics Series. A second edition was published in 1992, a third edition in 2000, a fourth edition in 2006, and a fifth edition in 2015. The book resulted from Walzer's reflections on the Vietnam War.

== Summary ==
Walzer draws on medieval Just War theory to explore the reasons that can justify war jus ad bellum and the ethical limits on the conduct of war jus in bello in an attempt to work out a modern, secular theory of just war.

Walzer precises that in war not all action is equal, a just war exists and must be implemented through a strict display of rules.

== Reception ==
Just and Unjust Wars has, together with Spheres of Justice (1983) and Interpretation and Social Criticism (1987), been identified as one of Walzer's most important works by the philosopher Will Kymlicka in The Oxford Companion to Philosophy (2005). The work is considered a standard in the philosophical literature on the ethics of warfare, with the Stanford Encyclopedia of Philosophy calling Just and Unjust Wars "extraordinarily influential" and "the major contemporary statement of just war theory."

The book has been translated to French by Simone Chambon and Anne Wicke and published in the collection of Claude Lefort in Belin.
