= Law of war =

International regulations of warfare

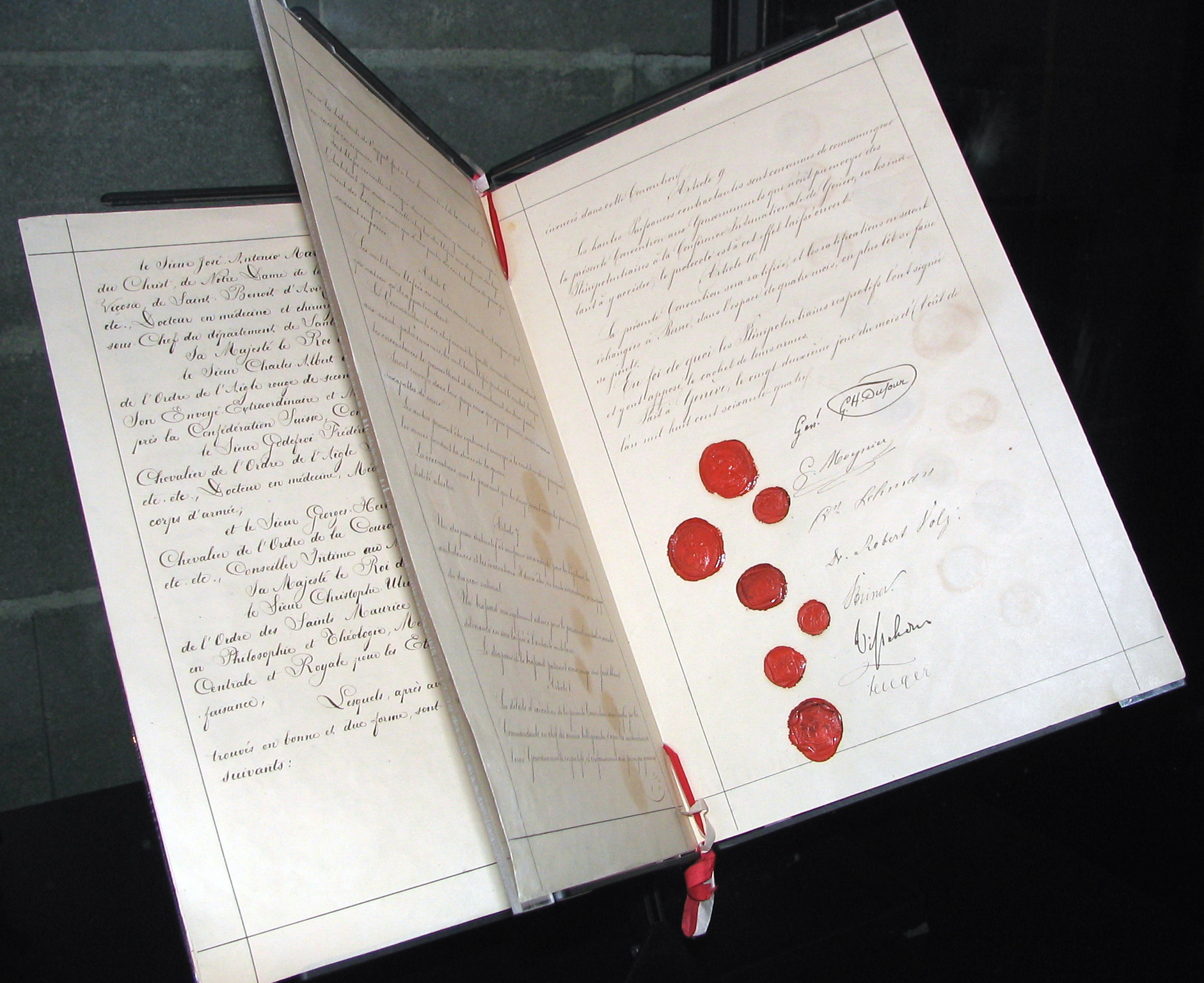
The First Geneva Convention governing the sick and wounded members of armed forces was signed in 1864.

The law of war is the part of international law that regulates the conditions for initiating war and the conduct of hostilities. The term includes the law governing the right to use force (jus ad bellum) and the law applicable during wartime (jus in bello). Laws of war define sovereignty and nationhood, states and territories, occupation, and other critical terms of law. Among other issues, the modern laws of war address the declarations of war; acceptance of surrender and the treatment of prisoners of war; the principles of distinction, as well as military necessity and proportionality; and the prohibition of certain weapons that cause unnecessary or excessive suffering.

While international humanitarian law (IHL) concerns the rules and principles governing the conduct of warfare once armed conflict has begun, jus ad bellum (an aspect of public international law) pertains to the justification for resorting to war and includes the crime of aggression. Together the jus in bello and jus ad bellum comprise the two strands of the laws of war governing all aspects of international armed conflicts. The law is mandatory for nations bound by the appropriate treaties. There are also other customary unwritten rules of war, many of which were explored at the Nuremberg trials. IHL operates on a strict division between rules applicable in international armed conflict and internal armed conflict.

The law of war is considered distinct from other bodies of law—such as the domestic law of a particular belligerent to a conflict—which may provide additional legal limits to the conduct or justification of war.

== History ==
=== Ancient origins ===
States have long employed law to limit their conflicts. The first traces of a law of war come from the Babylonians. It is the Code of Hammurabi, king of Babylon, which in 1750 B.C., explains its laws imposing a code of conduct in the event of war:

I prescribe these laws so that the strong do not oppress the weak.

An example from the Book of Deuteronomy 20:19–20 limits the amount of environmental damage, allowing only the cutting down of non-fruitful trees for use in the siege operation, while fruitful trees should be preserved for use as a food source. Similarly, Deuteronomy 21:10–14 requires that female captives who were forced to marry the victors of a war, then not desired anymore, be let go wherever they want, and requires them not to be treated as slaves nor be sold for money.

=== Religious frameworks ===
In the early 7th century, the first Caliph Abu Bakr, while instructing his army, laid down rules against the mutilation of corpses, killing children, women, and the elderly. He also laid down rules against environmental harm to trees and slaying of the enemy's animals:

Stop, O people, that I may give you ten rules for your guidance in the battlefield. Do not commit treachery or deviate from the right path. You must not mutilate dead bodies. Neither kill a child, nor a woman, nor an aged man. Bring no harm to the trees, nor burn them with fire, especially those which are fruitful. Slay not any of the enemy's flock, save for your food. You are likely to pass by people who have devoted their lives to monastic services; leave them alone.

In the history of the early Christian church, many Christian writers considered that Christians could not be soldiers or fight wars. Augustine of Hippo contradicted this and wrote about 'just war' doctrine, in which he explained the circumstances when war could or could not be morally justified.

In 697, Adomnan of Iona gathered Kings and church leaders from around Ireland and Scotland to Birr, where he gave them the 'Law of the Innocents', which banned killing women and children in war, and the destruction of churches.

Apart from chivalry in medieval Europe, the Roman Catholic Church also began promulgating teachings on just war, reflected to some extent in movements such as the Peace and Truce of God. The impulse to restrict the extent of warfare, and especially protect the lives and property of non-combatants continued with Hugo Grotius and his attempts to write laws of war.

=== Early modern period ===
In part because of Grotius and the development of the modern law of nations, for almost three centuries after the conclusion of the Thirty Years War Europe entered a period of what may be termed “the golden age of the jus in bello, of frame positive constraints on the conduct of war." Generally, international conflicts in Europe were set piece battles waged by professional armies fighting for limited and fixed political objectives. Civilians and civilian populations were usually left more or less unharmed by military forces.

The Treaty of Armistice and Regularization of War signed on November 25 and 26, 1820, between the president of the Republic of Colombia, Simón Bolívar and the Chief of the Military Forces of the Spanish Kingdom, Pablo Morillo, is the precursor of the International Humanitarian Law. The Treaty of Guadalupe Hidalgo, signed and ratified by the United States and Mexico in 1848, articulates rules for any future wars, including protection of civilians and treatment of prisoners of war. The Lieber Code, promulgated by the Union during the American Civil War, was critical in the development of the laws of land warfare.

As the 19th century unfolded, the effort to codify and develop the law of war and to control the use of arms became even more earnest. There were profound hopes that war might eventually be abolished since civilization had become so advanced. Such hopes were linked to the idea that international adjudication and arbitration could come to replace war as a means of international dispute settlement. In 1864, 12 countries signed the Geneva Red Cross Convention, protecting hospital and ambulance crews.

Between 1899 and 1907, many various and detailed Hague Conventions were issued that were a produce of two Hague Peace Conferences. The first conference was convened in 1899, following a call by Tsar Nicholas II in 1898, who declared:

[T]hat the present moment would be very favorable for seeking, by means of international discussion, the most effectual means of insuring to all peoples the benefits of a real and durable peace, and, above all, of putting an end to the progressive development of the present armaments.

Historian Geoffrey Best called the period from 1856 to 1909 the law of war's "epoch of highest repute". The defining aspect of this period was the establishment, by states, of a positive legal or legislative foundation (i.e., written) superseding a regime based primarily on religion, chivalry, and customs. It is during this "modern" era that the international conference became the forum for debate and agreement between states and the "multilateral treaty" served as the positive mechanism for codification.

=== 20th century development ===
The Nuremberg war crimes trials judgment on "The Law Relating to War Crimes and Crimes Against Humanity" held, under the Nuremberg Principles, that treaties like the Hague Convention of 1907, having been widely accepted by "all civilised nations" for about half a century, were by then part of the customary laws of war and binding on all parties whether the party was a signatory to the specific treaty or not.

== Modern sources ==
The modern law of war is made up from three principal sources:

- Lawmaking treaties (or conventions)—see § International treaties on the laws of war below.
- Custom. Not all the law of war derives from or has been incorporated in such treaties, which can refer to the continuing importance of customary law as articulated by the Martens Clause. Such customary international law is established by the general practice of nations together with their acceptance that such practice is required by law.
- General Principles. "Certain fundamental principles provide basic guidance. For instance, the principles of distinction, proportionality, and necessity, all of which are part of customary international law, always apply to the use of armed force."

Interpretations of international humanitarian law change over time and this also affects the laws of war. For example, Carla Del Ponte, the chief prosecutor for the International Criminal Tribunal for the former Yugoslavia pointed out in 2001 that although there is no specific treaty ban on the use of depleted uranium projectiles, there is a developing scientific debate and concern expressed regarding the effect of the use of such projectiles and it is possible that, in future, there may be a consensus view in international legal circles that use of such projectiles violates general principles of the law applicable to use of weapons in armed conflict.

== Purposes ==
It has often been commented that creating laws for something as inherently lawless as war seems like a lesson in absurdity. But based on the adherence to what amounted to customary international humanitarian law by warring parties through the ages, it was believed by many, especially after the eighteenth century, that codifying laws of war would be beneficial. Classifications of what kind of conflict is taking place is also important. Depending on how a conflict is classified certain actors may or may not use force against another power. This can lead to tactical classification of a conflict so that one actor has the sole right of force. Sometimes a new body of law is even created to do so.

Some of the central principles underlying laws of war are:

- the distinction between civilians and combatants.
- the prohibition to attack those hors de combat.
- the prohibition to inflict unnecessary suffering.
- the principle of necessity.
- the principle of proportionality.

To this end, laws of war are intended to mitigate the hardships of war by:

- Protecting both combatants and protected non-combatants from unnecessary suffering.
- Safeguarding certain fundamental human rights of protected persons who fall into the hands of the enemy, particularly prisoners of war, the wounded and sick, children, and protected civilians.
- Facilitating the restoration of peace.

The idea that there is a right to war concerns, on the one hand, the jus ad bellum, the right to make war or to enter war, assuming a motive such as to defend oneself from a threat or danger, presupposes a declaration of war that warns the adversary: war is a loyal act, and on the other hand, jus in bello, the law of war, the way of making war, which involves behaving as soldiers invested with a mission for which all violence is not allowed. In any case, the very idea of a right to war is based on an idea of war that can be defined as an armed conflict, limited in space, limited in time, and by its objectives. War begins with a declaration (of war), ends with a treaty (of peace) or surrender agreement, an act of sharing, etc. Laws of war serve the conflicts that are currently taking place. As conflicts change over time so do the laws that govern them. New laws can therefore be created. This is recently seen in the "assassination policies" adopted during the "war on terror".

== International treaties on the laws of war ==
List of declarations, conventions, treaties, and judgments on the laws of war:

- 1856: the Paris Declaration Respecting Maritime Law abolished privateering.
- 1863: United States military adopts the Lieber Code, a compilation of extant international norms on the treatment of civilians assembled by German scholar Franz Lieber.
- 1864: Geneva Convention for the Amelioration of the Condition of the Wounded and Sick in Armed Forces in the Field
- 1868: the St. Petersburg Declaration, officially the Declaration Renouncing the Use, in Time of War, of Explosive Projectiles Under 400 Grammes Weight. Only applies to conflicts between its signatories and their successor states, several of which no longer exist as sovereign states.
- 1874: Project of an International Declaration concerning the Laws and Customs of War (Brussels Declaration) Signed in Brussels 27 August. This agreement never entered into force, but formed part of the basis for the codification of the laws of war at the 1899 Hague Peace Conference.
- 1880: Manual of the Laws and Customs of War at Oxford. At its session in Geneva in 1874 the Institute of International Law appointed a committee to study the Brussels Declaration of the same year and to submit to the Institute its opinion and supplementary proposals on the subject. The work of the Institute led to the adoption of the Manual in 1880 and it went on to form part of the basis for the codification of the laws of war at the 1899 Hague Peace Conference.
- 1899: The Hague Conventions consisted of three main sections and three additional declarations:
  - I – Pacific Settlement of International Disputes
  - II – Laws and Customs of War on Land
  - III – Adaptation to Maritime Warfare of Principles of Geneva Convention of 1864
  - Declaration I – On the Launching of Projectiles and Explosives from Balloons
  - Declaration II – On the Use of Projectiles the Object of Which is the Diffusion of Asphyxiating or Deleterious Gases
  - Declaration III – On the Use of Bullets Which Expand or Flatten Easily in the Human Body
- 1907: The revised Hague Conventions had thirteen sections, of which twelve were ratified and entered into force, and two declarations:
  - I – The Pacific Settlement of International Disputes
  - II – The Limitation of Employment of Force for Recovery of Contract Debts
  - III – The Opening of Hostilities
  - IV – The Laws and Customs of War on Land
  - V – The Rights and Duties of Neutral Powers and Persons in Case of War on Land
  - VI – The Status of Enemy Merchant Ships at the Outbreak of Hostilities
  - VII – The Conversion of Merchant Ships into War-ships
  - VIII – The Laying of Automatic Submarine Contact Mines
  - IX – Bombardment by Naval Forces in Time of War
  - X – Adaptation to Maritime War of the Principles of the Geneva Convention
  - XI – Certain Restrictions with Regard to the Exercise of the Right of Capture in Naval War
  - XII – The Creation of an International Prize Court (not ratified)
  - XIII – The Rights and Duties of Neutral Powers in Naval War
  - Declaration I – extending Declaration II from the 1899 Conference to other types of aircraft
  - Declaration II – on the obligatory arbitration
- 1909: The London Declaration concerning the Laws of Naval War largely reiterated existing law, although it showed greater regard to the rights of neutral entities. Never went into effect.
- 1922: The Washington Naval Treaty, also known as the Five-Power Treaty (6 February)
- 1923: The Hague Draft Rules of Aerial Warfare. Never adopted in a legally binding form.
- 1925: The Geneva Protocol for the Prohibition of the Use in War of Asphyxiating, Poisonous or Other Gases, and of Bacteriological Methods of Warfare.
- 1927–1930: Greco-German arbitration tribunal
- 1928: General Treaty for Renunciation of War as an Instrument of National Policy (also known as the Pact of Paris or Kellogg-Briand Pact)
- 1929: Geneva Convention, Relative to the treatment of prisoners of war.
- 1929: Geneva Convention for the amelioration of the condition of the wounded and sick in armies in the field
- 1930: Treaty for the Limitation and Reduction of Naval Armament (22 April)
- 1935: Roerich Pact
- 1936: Second London Naval Treaty (25 March)
- 1938: Amsterdam Draft Convention for the Protection of Civilian Populations Against New Engines of War (officially the Draft Convention for the Protection of Civilian Populations Against New Engines of War. Amsterdam, 1938). This convention was never ratified.
- 1938: League of Nations declaration for the "Protection of Civilian Populations Against Bombing From the Air in Case of War".
- 1945: United Nations Charter (entered into force on October 24, 1945)
- 1946: Judgment of the International Military Tribunal at Nuremberg
- 1947: Nuremberg Principles formulated under UN General Assembly Resolution 177, 21 November 1947
- 1948: United Nations Convention on the Prevention and Punishment of the Crime of Genocide
- 1949: Geneva Conventions
  - Geneva Convention I for the Amelioration of the Condition of the Wounded and Sick in Armed Forces in the Field
  - Geneva Convention II for the Amelioration of the Condition of Wounded, Sick and Shipwrecked Members of Armed Forces at Sea
  - Geneva Convention III Relative to the Treatment of Prisoners of War
  - Geneva Convention IV Relative to the Protection of Civilian Persons in Time of War
- 1954: Hague Convention for the Protection of Cultural Property in the Event of Armed Conflict
- 1971: Zagreb Resolution of the Institute of International Law on Conditions of Application of Humanitarian Rules of Armed Conflict to Hostilities in which the United Nations Forces May be Engaged
- 1974: United Nations Declaration on the Protection of Women and Children in Emergency and Armed Conflict
- 1977: United Nations Convention on the Prohibition of Military or Any Other Hostile Use of Environmental Modification Techniques
- 1977: Geneva Protocol I Additional to the Geneva Conventions of 12 August 1949, and Relating to the Protection of Victims of International Armed Conflicts (IACs)
- 1977: Geneva Protocol II Additional to the Geneva Conventions of 12 August 1949, and Relating to the Protection of Victims of Non-International Armed Conflicts (NIACs)
- 1978 Red Cross Fundamental Rules of International Humanitarian Law Applicable in Armed Conflicts
- 1980: United Nations Convention on Prohibitions or Restrictions on the Use of Certain Conventional Weapons Which May be Deemed to be Excessively Injurious or to Have Indiscriminate Effects (CCW)
  - 1980: Protocol I on Non-Detectable Fragments
  - 1980: Protocol II on Prohibitions or Restrictions on the Use of Mines, Booby-Traps and Other Devices
  - 1980: Protocol III on Prohibitions or Restrictions on the Use of Incendiary Weapons
  - 1995: Protocol IV on Blinding Laser Weapons
  - 1996: Amended Protocol II on Prohibitions or Restrictions on the Use of Mines, Booby-Traps and Other Devices
  - 2003: Protocol on Explosive Remnants of War (Protocol V to the 1980 Convention), 28 November 2003 (entered into force 12 November 2006)
- 1994: San Remo Manual on International Law Applicable to Armed Conflicts at Sea
- 1994: ICRC/UNGA Guidelines for Military Manuals and Instructions on the Protection of the Environment in Time of Armed Conflict
- 1994: UN Convention on the Safety of United Nations and Associated Personnel
- 1996: International Court of Justice advisory opinion on the Legality of the Threat or Use of Nuclear Weapons
- 1997: Convention on the Prohibition of the Use, Stockpiling, Production and Transfer of Anti-Personnel Mines and on their Destruction (Ottawa Treaty)
- 1998: Rome Statute of the International Criminal Court (entered into force 1 July 2002)
- 2000: Optional Protocol on the Involvement of Children in Armed Conflict (entered into force 12 February 2002)
- 2005: Geneva Protocol III Additional to the Geneva Conventions of 12 August 1949, and Relating to the Adoption of an Additional Distinctive Emblem
- 2008: Convention on Cluster Munitions (entered into force 1 August 2010)
- 2017: Treaty on the Prohibition of Nuclear Weapons (entered into force 22 January 2021)

== See also ==
- Arms control – Term for international restriction of weapons (includes list of treaties)
- Command responsibility – Doctrine of hierarchical accountability
- Crimes against humanity – Concept in international law
- Customary international humanitarian law – Body of unwritten rules
- Debellatio – War ending in defeated nation ceasing to exist
- International law – Norms in international relations
- Islamic military jurisprudence – Islamic laws of war
- Journal of International Law of Peace and Armed Conflict – Journal of the Institute for International Law of Peace and Armed Conflict
- Jus post bellum – "Justice after war"
- Group of Governmental Experts on Lethal Autonomous Weapons Systems – UN expert group on lethal autonomous weapons systems
- Law of occupation – Occupation and the laws of war
- Law of the Sea – International law concerning maritime environments
- Lawfare – Weaponization of legal systems
- Lex pacificatoria – Concept in international relations
- List of Articles of War – War regulations
- List of weapons of mass destruction treaties
- Right of conquest – Concept in political science
- Rule of Law in Armed Conflicts Project (RULAC) – International law initiative
- Self-defence in international law
- Targeted killing – Extrajudicial assassination by governments
- Total war – Conflict in which all of a nation's resources are deployed
