= Peace treaty =

Agreement between hostile parties

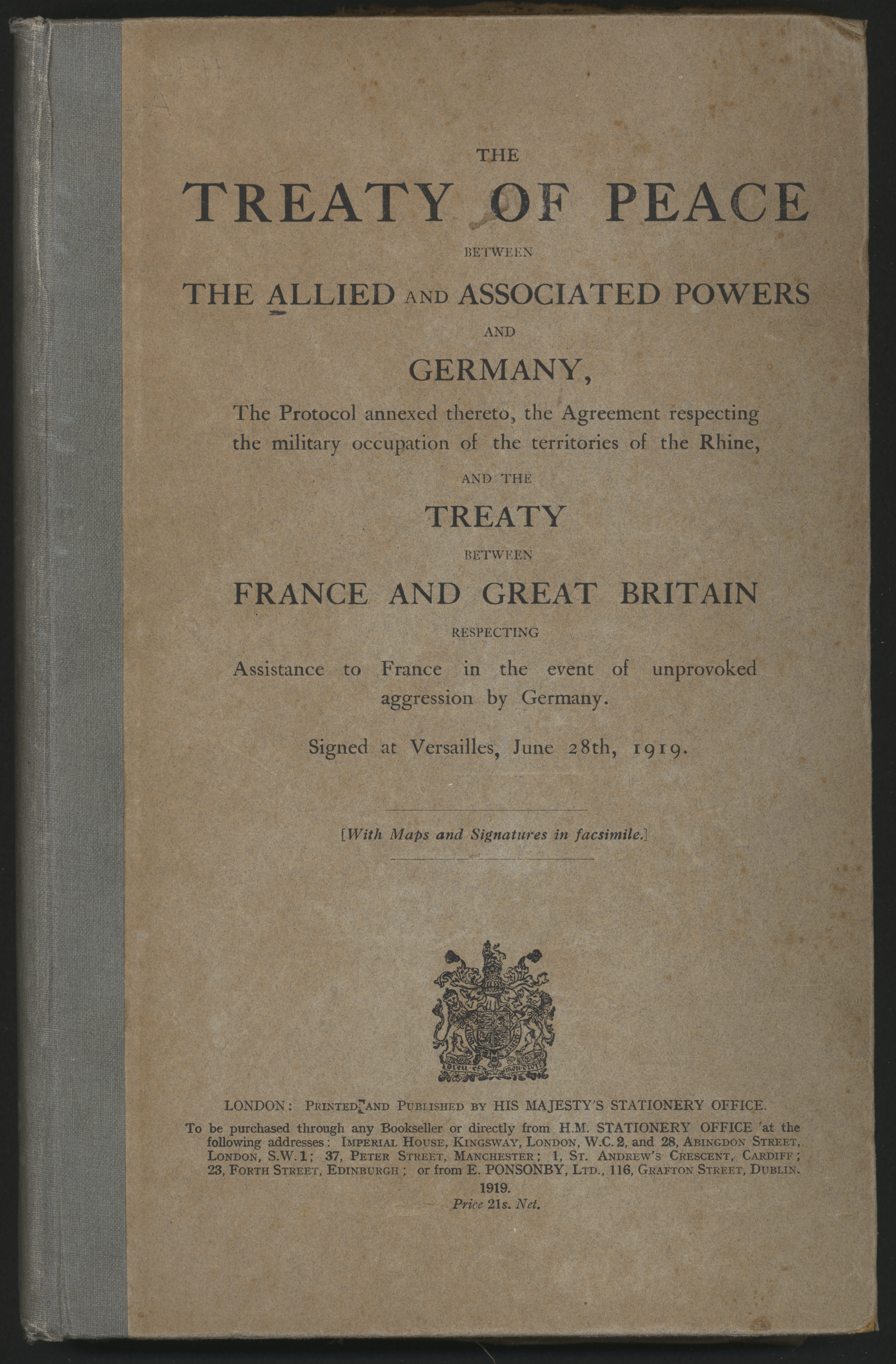
The Treaty of Versailles, signed at the conclusion of World War I

A peace treaty is an agreement between two or more hostile parties, usually countries or governments, which formally ends a state of war between the parties. It is different from an armistice, which is an agreement to stop hostilities; a surrender, in which an army agrees to give up arms; or a ceasefire or truce, in which the parties may agree to temporarily or permanently stop fighting.

The need for a peace treaty in diplomacy arises from the fact that even when a war is actually over and fighting has ceased, the legal and political state of war is not automatically terminated upon the end of actual fighting and the belligerent parties are still legally defined as enemies. This is evident from the definition of a "state of war" as "a legal state created and ended by official declaration regardless of actual armed hostilities and usually characterized by operation of the rules of war". As a result, even when hostilities are over, a peace treaty is required for the former belligerents in order to reach an, agreement on all issues involved in transition to a legal state of peace. The skill of negotiating a peace treaty in the modern era has been referred to by legal scholar Christine Bell as the lex pacificatoria, with a peace treaty potentially contributing to the legal framework governing the post conflict period, or jus post bellum.

Since 1950, the rate at which interstate wars end with a formal peace treaty has substantially declined.

== Elements of treaties ==
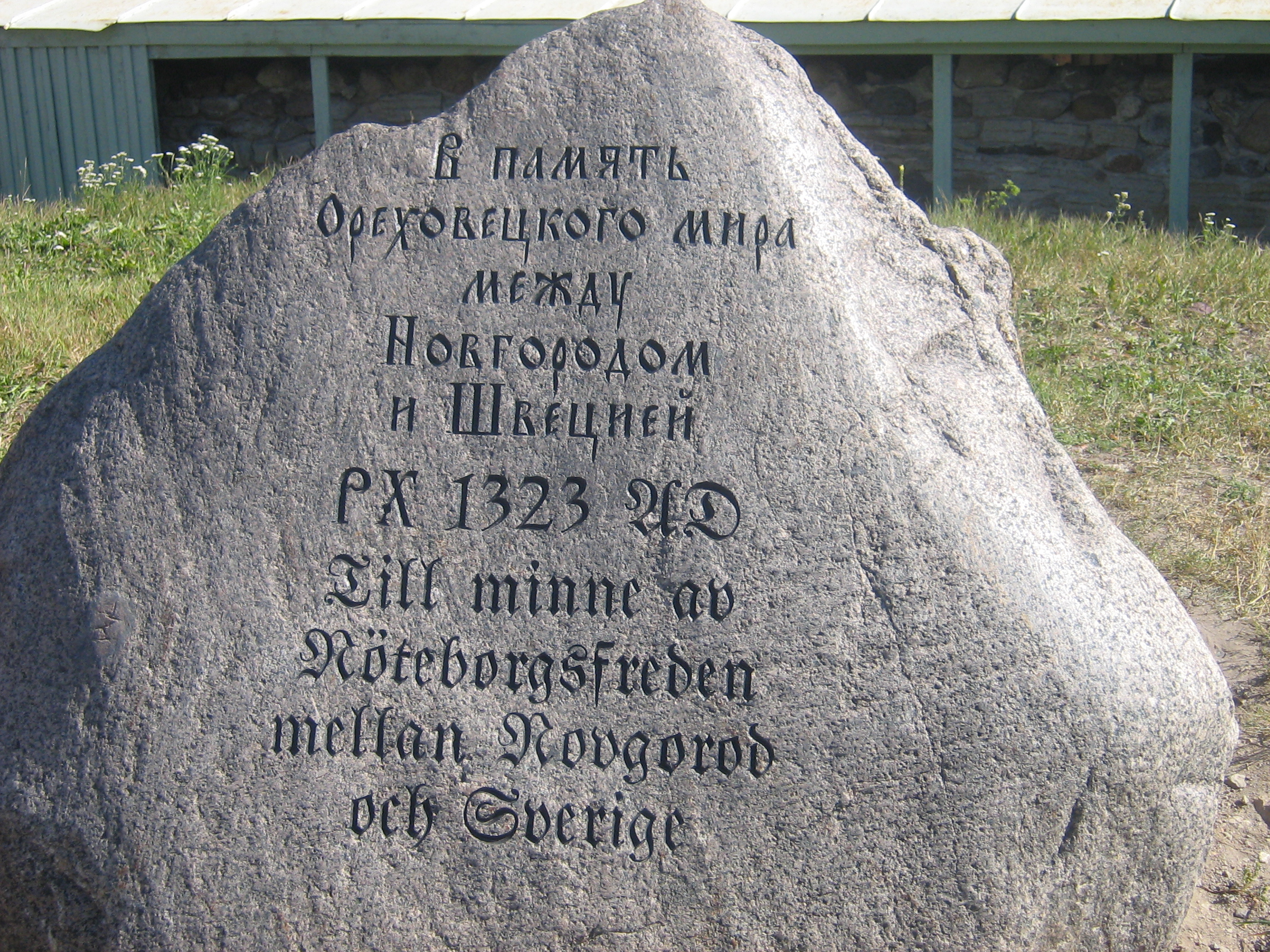
The "Peace Memorial" about the Treaty of Nöteborg at the Orekhovy Island

The content of a treaty usually depends on the nature of the conflict being concluded. In the case of large conflicts between numerous parties, international treaty covering all issues or separate treaties signed between each party.

There are many possible issues that may be included in a peace treaty such as the following:

- Formal designation of borders
- Processes for resolving future disputes
- Access to and apportioning of resources
- Status of refugees
- Status of prisoners of war
- Settling of existing debts
- Defining of as unjust behavior
- The re-application of existing treaties
- Revenge

In modern history, certain intractable conflict situations may be brought to a ceasefire before they are dealt with via a peace process in which a number of discrete steps are taken on each side to reach the mutually-desired eventual goal of peace and the signing of a treaty.

== Role of the United Nations ==
Since its founding after World War II the United Nations has sought to act as a forum for resolution in matters of international conflict. A number of international treaties and obligations are involved in which member states seek to limit and control behavior during wartime. The action of declaring war is now very unlikely to be undertaken.

=== Peace treaty under the United Nations ===
Since the end of World War II, United Nations Charter Article 2 restricts the use of military force. The UN Charter allows only two exceptions: "military measures by UN Security Council resolutions" and "exercise of self-defense" in countries subjected to armed attacks in relation to the use of force by states. Under the current UN system, war is triggered only by the enforcement of military measures under UN Security Council resolutions or the exercise of self-defense rights against illegal armed attacks.

Therefore, if the use of military force arises, it is called 'international armed conflict' instead of 'war'. The fact that the current international law system avoids the use of the term 'war' also avoids the conclusion of a peace treaty based on the existence of war. A peace treaty was not signed after the end of the Iraq War in 2003, and only the UN Security Council Resolution 1483, adopted on May 22, 2003, stipulated the postwar regime for the stability and security of Iraq exclusively.

=== Post-conflict elections ===
One of the UN's roles in peace processes is to conduct post-conflict elections but, on the whole, they are thought to have no effect, or even a negative effect, on peace after civil war.

However, when peace agreements transform rebel groups into political parties, the effect on peace is positive, especially if international interveners use their moments of power distribution to hold the former combatants to the terms of their peace agreement.

== Historic peace treaties ==
=== Ancient history ===
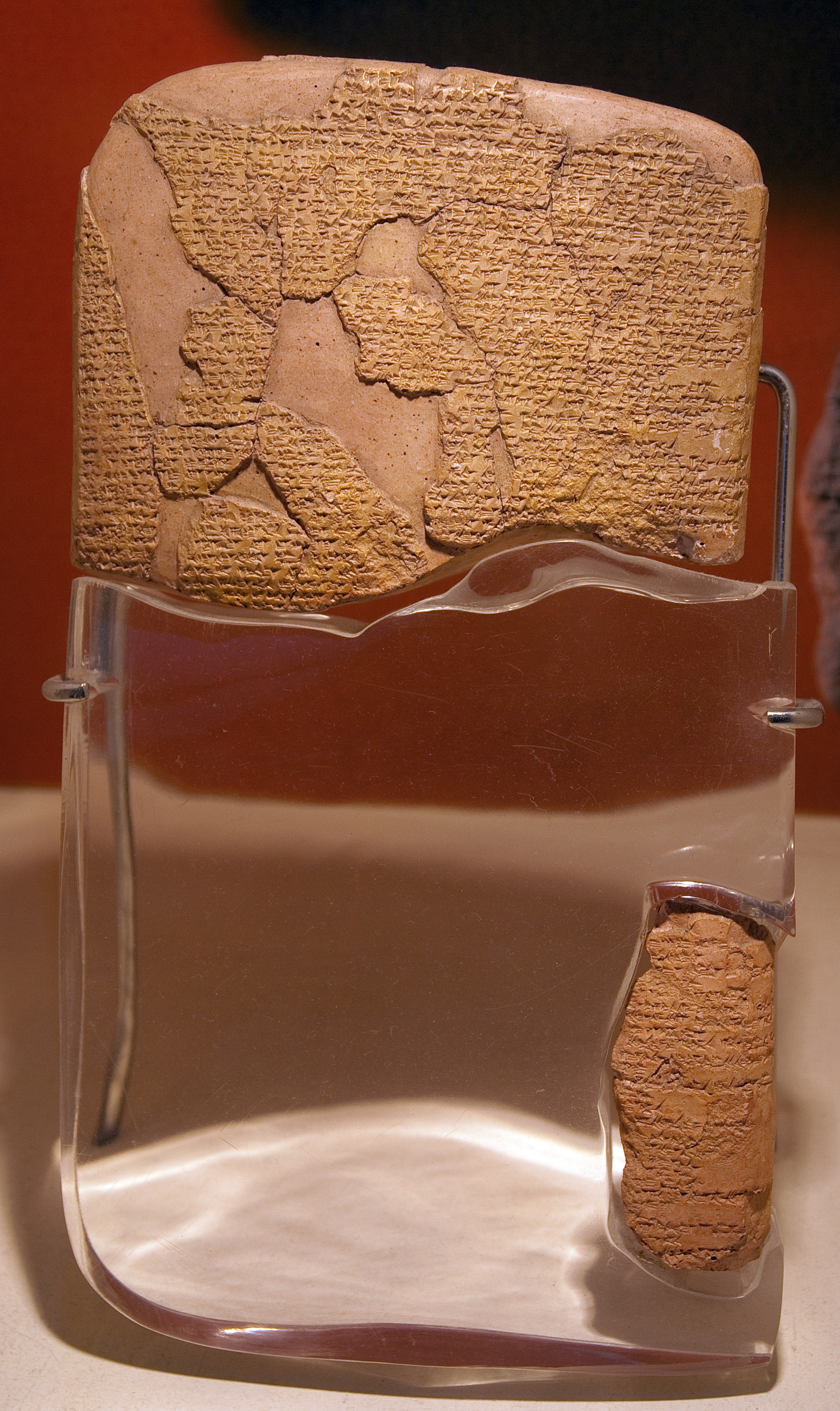
Tablet of one of the earliest recorded treaties in history, Treaty of Kadesh, at the Istanbul Archaeology Museum

Probably the earliest recorded peace treaty, although it is rarely mentioned or remembered, was between the Hittite Empire and the Hayasa-Azzi confederation, around 1350 BC. More famously, one of the earliest recorded peace treaties was concluded between the Hittite and the Egyptian Empires after 1274 BC Battle of Kadesh (see Egyptian-Hittite peace treaty). The battle took place in what is modern-day Syria, the entire Levant being at that time contested between the two empires. After an extremely costly four-day battle, in which neither side gained a substantial advantage, both sides claimed victory. The lack of resolution led to further conflict between Egypt and the Hittites, with Ramesses II capturing the city of Kadesh and Amurru in his 8th year as king. However, the prospect of further protracted conflict between the two states eventually persuaded both their rulers, Hatusiliš III and Ramesses, to end their dispute and sign a peace treaty. Neither side could afford the possibility of a longer conflict since they were threatened by other enemies: Egypt was faced with the task of defending its long western border with Libya against the incursion of Libyan tribesmen by building a chain of fortresses stretching from Mersa Matruh to Rakotis, and the Hittites faced a more formidable threat in the form of the Assyrian Empire, which "had conquered Hanigalbat, the heartland of Mitanni, between the Tigris and the Euphrates" rivers, which had previously been a Hittite vassal state.

The peace treaty was recorded in two versions, one in Egyptian hieroglyphs, and the other in Akkadian using cuneiform script; both versions survive. Such dual-language recording is common to many subsequent treaties. The treaty differs from others, however, in that the two language versions are worded differently. Although the majority of the text is identical, the Hittite version claims that the Egyptians came suing for peace, and the Egyptian version claims the reverse. The treaty was given to the Egyptians in the form of a silver plaque, and the "pocket-book" version was taken back to Egypt and carved into the Temple of Karnak.

The Treaty was concluded between Ramesses II and Hatusiliš III in the twenty-first year of Ramesses' reign (c. 1258 BC). Its eighteen articles call for peace between Egypt and Hatti and then proceed to maintain that their respective people also demand peace. It contains many elements found in more modern treaties, but it is more far-reaching than later treaties' simple declaration of the end of hostilities. It also contains a mutual-assistance pact in case one of the empires should be attacked by a third party or in the event of internal strife. There are articles pertaining to the forced repatriation of refugees and provisions that they should not be harmed, which might be thought of as the first extradition treaty. There are also threats of retribution, should the treaty be broken.

The treaty is considered of such importance in the field of international relations that a replica of it hangs in the UN's headquarters.

Following the five years' war between Kushite Kandake, Amanirenas and Augustus of Rome, a peace treaty was conducted in the year 21/20 BC. Mediators were sent from Kush to Augustus who was in Samos at that time. An entente between the two parties was beneficial to both. The Kushites were a regional power in their own right and resented paying tribute. The Romans also sought a quiet southern border for their absolutely essential Egyptian grain supplies, without constant war commitments, and welcomed a friendly buffer state in a border region beset with raiding nomads. The Kushites too appear to have found nomads like the Blemmyes to be a problem. The conditions were ripe for a deal. During negotiations, Augustus granted the Kushite envoys all they asked for, and also cancelled the tribute earlier demanded by Rome. Premmis (Qasr Ibrim), and areas north of Qasr Ibrim in the southern portion of the "Thirty-Mile Strip" were ceded to the Kushites. The Dodekaschoinos was established as a buffer zone, and Roman forces were pulled back to the old Greek Ptolemaic border at Maharraqa. Roman emperor Augustus signed the treaty with the Kushites on Samos. The settlement bought Rome peace and quiet on its Egyptian frontier, as well as increased the prestige of Roman Emperor Augustus, demonstrating his skill and ability to broker peace without constant warfare, and do business with the distant Kushites, who a short time earlier had been fighting his troops. The respect accorded the emperor by the Kushite envoys as the treaty also created a favorable impression with other foreign ambassadors present on Samos, including envoys from India, and strengthened Augustus' hand in upcoming negotiations with the powerful Parthians.

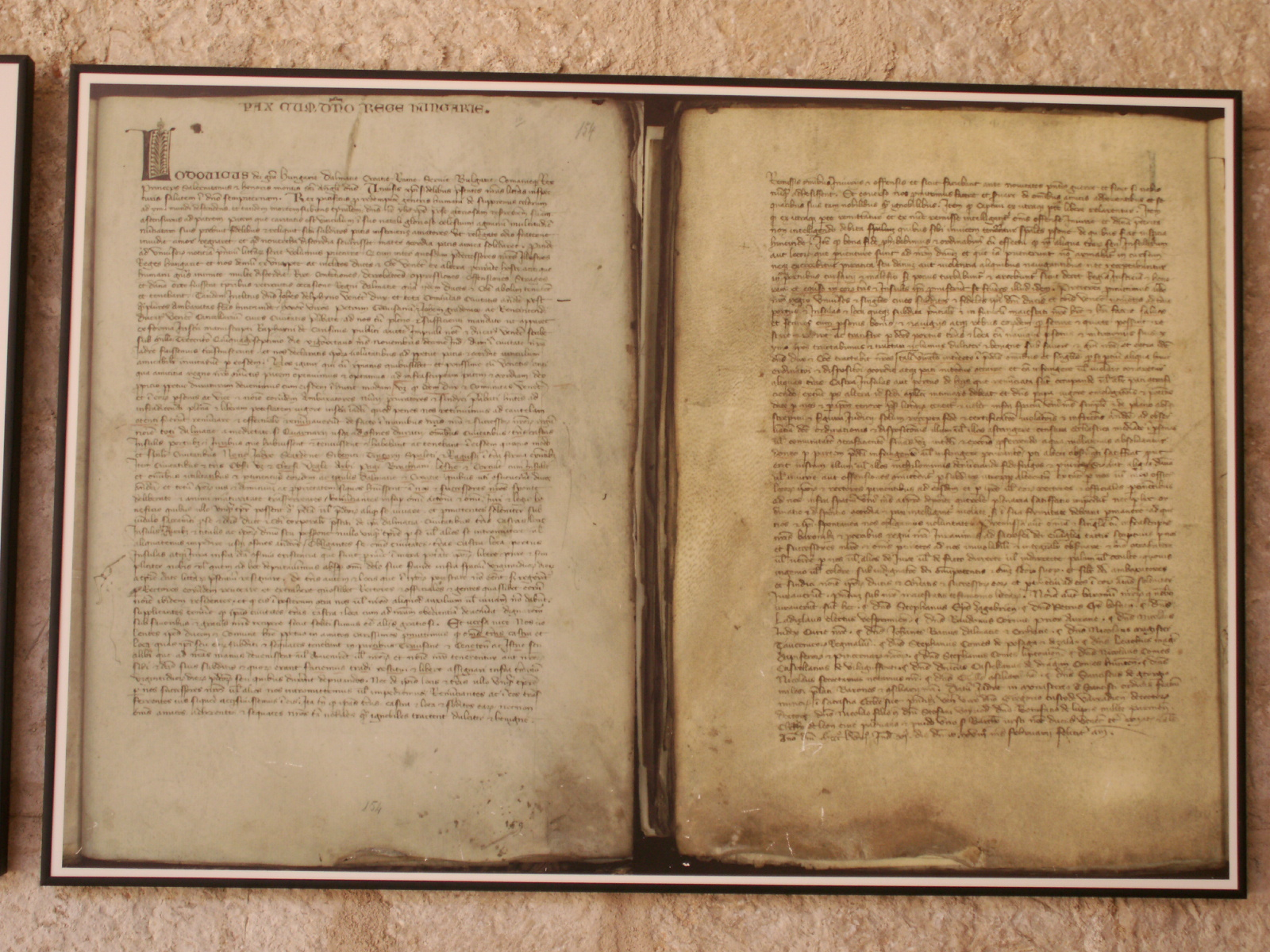
Peace-treaty of Zadar (1358), which ended the war between the Croato-Hungarian Kingdom and the Republic of Venice, forcing the latter to withdraw from Croatian coast

The settlement ushered in a period of peace between the two empires for around three centuries. Inscriptions erected by Queen Amanirenas on an ancient temple at Hamadab, south of Meroe, record the war and the favorable outcome from the Kushite perspective. Along with his signature on the official treaty, Roman emperor Augustus marked the agreement by directing his administrators to collaborate with regional priests in the erection of a temple at Dendur, and inscriptions depict the emperor himself celebrating local deities.

=== Modern history ===
Famous examples include the Treaty of Paris (1815), signed after Napoleon's defeat at the Battle of Waterloo, and the Treaty of Versailles, formally ending the First World War between Germany and the Allies. Despite popular belief, the war did not end completely until the Allies concluded peace with the Ottoman Empire in 1919 at the Treaty of Sèvres, and even then the reaction to this treaty caused the outbreak of the Turkish War of Independence. Upon the victory of the Turkish National Movement in that conflict and the signing of the Treaty of Lausanne, the last major diplomatic extension of the First World War came to an end.

The Treaty of Versailles, as well as the Kellogg-Briand Pact, is possibly the most notorious of peace treaties, and is blamed by many historians for the rise of Nazism in Germany and the eventual outbreak of the Second World War in 1939. The costly reparations that Germany was forced to pay the victors, the fact that Germany had to accept sole responsibility for starting the war, and the harsh restrictions on German rearmament were all listed in the Treaty of Versailles and caused massive resentment in Germany. Whether or not the treaty can be blamed for starting another war, it exemplifies the difficulties involved in making peace. However, no such conflict resulted from the more punitive settlement with the Ottoman Empire.

Another famous example would be the series of peace treaties known as the Peace of Westphalia. It initiated modern diplomacy, involving the modern system of nation-states. Subsequent wars were no longer over religion but revolved around issues of state. That encouraged Catholic and Protestant powers to ally, leading to a number of major realignments.

The Korean War is an example of a conflict that was ended by an armistice, rather than a peace treaty with the Korean Armistice Agreement. However, that war has never technically ended, because a final peace treaty or settlement has never been achieved.

A more recent example of a peace treaty is the 1973 Paris Peace Accords that sought to end the Vietnam War.

== See also ==
- Bargaining model of war
- Diplomacy
- Ius gentium
- Lex pacificatoria
- Jus post bellum
- List of peace activists
- List of treaties
- List of ancient treaties
- Peace
- Peace Treaty on Korean Peninsula
- Treaty of Zadar
- Peace with Honor
- Perpetual peace
- Security dilemma
- Separate peace
- Uppsala Conflict Data Program, a dataset of all comprehensive agreements, partial agreements or peace process agreements between actors in armed conflict since 1975
