= Ontario Culture Days =

Festival of events in Canada

Ontario Culture Days is a province-wide fall festival of events that occur throughout Ontario, Canada. Hundreds of art, cultural and heritage events take place in the three-week-long festival. Some events are free and some charge an entrance fee.

== History ==
The festival started in 2010 and was originally three days in length. It was initially organized by Canadian Arts Summit. Since 2020, the festival has incorporated a "Creatives In Residence" program. Since 2021, the festival has included hubs of events in towns and cities.

The 2021 festival occurred between September 24 and October 24. The Re-Imagine theme was described as an invitation to participants to reconsider the role of art and culture in the aftermath of the COVID-19 pandemic.

The 2023 festival occurred between September 22 and October 15 and included eight hubs including Caledon, St. Catharines and Thunder Bay.

The 2024 Culture Days occurred between September 20 and October 13. The festival featured hubs in Brant,Niagara Region and St. Catharines, Gananoque and Thousand Islands, Guelph, Manitoulin Island, Halton, Ottawa, Sault Ste. Marie, Scugog, Thunder Bay, Toronto, Vaughan, and Windsor.

=== Spotlight Awards ===
Since 2020, Ontario Culture Days has organized Spotlight Awards. Since 2023, the Spotlight Awards has included Warren Garrett Inclusive Programming Award, named after one of the organization's founding board members. The awardees are selected by a jury based on programmatic impact.

Year	Award	Event	Location	Organizer	Ref.
2024	Best In-Person Program	Stories of Peace Award Ceremony	Bancroft	Canadian Peace Museum	
2024	People's Choice	Nature's Threads	Barrie	Ebru Winegard	
2024	Best Collaborative Program	Paris Birds for Diversity	Paris	Carolina Saenz from La Trenza Tacos, Lisa Franklin from Forest and Folk, and Mountain WoodWork Canada	
2024	Warren Garrett Inclusive Programming Award	Performing the Apocalypse: A Performance Art Workshop with Megan Arnold	Guelph	Jude Akrey	
2023	Best In-Person Program	Dance Together Festival	York	Dance Together Festival	
2023	People's Choice	World of Threads	Oakville	World of Threads Festival	
2023	Best Collaborative Program	A Place I Call Home Halton	Oakville	Faisal Anwar	
2023	Warren Garrett Inclusive Programming Award	Daniel's Cafe	Vaughan	Daniel Xia	
2022	Best In-Person Program	ArohaFest Diwali Celebration	Ottawa	National Arts Centre	
2022	People's Choice	Sisters in Spirit Vigil	Vaughan	City of Vaughan, Mississaugas of the Credit First Nation	
2022	Best Collaborative Program	Reshaping Ruins	Guelph	The City of Guelph Museums & Culture	
2022	Best Digital Program	Let's honour our mother tongue!	Toronto	Yannis Lobaina	
2022	Inclusive Programming	Radical Connections	Ottawa	Radical Connections Unmasked Connections	
2021	Best In-Person Program	ON THE TABLE: Controlled Collaborative Chaos	Halton Hills	Pauline Gladstone	
2021	People's Choice	Honeymoon – My Pocketbook of I Love You's	Vaughan	Madeline Fiore	
2021	Best Digital Program	Healing the Scars of Colonialism	Milton	Arts Milton, Grandmother's Voice	
2021	Inclusive Programming	Engaging in ASL and Beyond	Milton	Arts Milton, E.C. Drury School for the Deaf	
2020	Accessibility	Be Moved by Art	Ottawa	CJ Fleury	
2020	Creative Solutioneering	Curbside Concerts Featuring "The Vaudevillian"	Milton	Arts Milton, Rick Imus	
2020	Participation From a Distance	Come Together	Milton	Arts Milton, House of Chords	
2020	People's Choice	Halton Mural Project	Milton	Arts Milton, Pflag	

== Organization ==
The festival is organized by a nonprofit organization also called Ontario Culture Days. The organization's Executive Director is Ruth Burns.

It is one of six provincial festivals organized by Toronto-based organization Culture Days. The other five festivals are Alberta Culture Days, B.C. Culture Days, Saskatchewan Culture Days, Manitoba Culture Days, and Journées de la culture (in Quebec).
