= Revisionist just war theory =

Revisionist just war theory is a development of just war theory that, unlike traditional just war theory, seeks to integrate jus ad bellum and jus in bello, therefore rejecting many traditional beliefs such as moral equality of combatants. Revisionists argue that international law is at best a pragmatic fiction—it lacks deeper moral foundations.

Additionally, the distinctive methodologies associated with the use of nuclear weapons to wage mass war in the modern era, have also led some "nonreductive" revisionists to question the relevance of the just war theory itself. Such particular criticisms are more limited in scope, however, than the generalized objections which have been raised by both realists and pacifists.
