= List of United Nations General Assembly Resolutions adopted at its 2nd Session =

This is a list of resolutions adopted by the United Nations General Assembly during its 2nd session held in 1947–1948.

Resolution No.	Date	Vote	Topic
108	30 September 1947		Admission of Yemen and Pakistan to membership in the United Nations
109	21 October 1947	40-6-11	Threats to the political independence and territorial integrity of Greece
110	3 November 1947	without vote	Measures to be taken against propaganda and the inciters of a new war
111	13 November 1947	41-6-6	Establishment of an Interim Committee of the General Assembly
112	14 November 1947	43-0-6	The problem of the independence of Korea
113	17 November 1947		Admission of new Members
114	17 November 1947	36-5-12	Relations of Members of the United Nations with Spain
115	21 November 1947	without vote	Report of the Security Council
116	21 November 1947	without vote	Rules governing the admission of new Members
117	21 November 1947	38-6-11	Convocation of a general conference under article 109 of the Charter to amend the privilege of the veto and resolution of the 2nd part of the 1st session of the General Assembly in relation to the exercise of the veto
118	31 October 1947	without vote	Reports on world economic conditions and trends
119	31 October 1947	without vote	Implementation of recommendations on economic and social matters
120	31 October 1947	43-0-4	Study of factors bearing upon the establishment of an economic commission for the Middle East
121	31 October 1947	without vote	Application of Italy for membership in the International Civil Aviation Organization
122	1 November 1947	39-5-2	Application of Austria for membership in the International Civil Aviation Organization
123	17 November 1947	without vote	Report of the Economic and Social Council
124	15 November 1947	without vote	Agreements with specialized agencies
125	20 November 1947	without vote	Relations with and co-ordination of specialized agencies and work programs of the United Nations and specialized agencies
126	20 October 1947	52-0-3	Transfer to the United Nations of the functions and powers exercised by the League of Nations under the International Convention of 30 September 1921 on Traffic in Women and Children, the Convention of 11 October 1933 on Traffic in Women of Full Age, and the Convention of 12 September 1923 on Traffic in Obscene Publications
127	15 November 1947	without vote	False and distorted reports
128	17 November 1947	45-6-2	Trade union rights (Freedom of association)
129	17 November 1947	without vote	Transfer to the World Health Organization of certain assets of the United Nations
130	17 November 1947	without vote	Report to the Economic and Social Council on the work of regional conferences and assemblies
131	17 November 1947	without vote	Entry into force of the constitution of the World Health Organization
132	17 November 1947	without vote	Conference on Freedom of Information
133	17 November 1947	without vote	Exchange of workers
134	17 November 1947	without vote	Inquiry concerning the mastication of coca leaves
135	17 November 1947	without vote	Entry into force of the Protocol of 11 December 1946 on Narcotic Drugs
136	17 November 1947	49-0-4	International co-operation for the prevention of immigration which is likely to disturb friendly relations between nations
137	17 November 1947	without vote	Teaching of the purposes and principles, the structure and activities of the United Nations in the schools of Member States
138	20 November 1947	without vote	International Children's Emergency Fund
139	1 November 1947	without vote	Report of the Trusteeship Council covering its 1st session
140	1 November 1947	46-6-1	Proposed Trusteeship Agreement for Nauru
141	1 November 1947	41-10-4	Consideration of proposed new trusteeship agreements, if any: question of South West Africa
142	3 November 1947	without vote	Standard form for the guidance of Members in the preparation of information to be transmitted under Article 73 e of the Charter
143	3 November 1947	44-0-0	Supplemental documents relating to information transmitted under Article 73 e of the Charter
144	3 November 1947	44-2-5	Voluntary transmission of information regarding the development of self-governing institutions in the Non-Self-Governing Territories
145	3 November 1947	without vote	Collaboration of the specialized agencies in regard to Article 73 e of the Charter
146	3 November 1947	49-0-4	Creation of a special committee on information transmitted under Article 73 e of the Charter
147	20 October 1947	without vote	Financial report and accounts for the first financial period, ended 31 December 1946, and report of the Board of Auditors
148	1 November 1947	without vote	Appointments to fill vacancies in the membership of the Advisory Committee on Administrative and Budgetary Questions
149	1 November 1947	without vote	Appointments to fill vacancies in the membership of the Committee on Contributions
150	1 November 1947	without vote	Appointment to fill a vacancy in the membership of the Board of Auditors
151	15 November 1947	without vote	Report of the Committee on Contributions
152	15 November 1947	without vote	Simultaneous interpretation
153	15 November 1947	without vote	Composition of the Secretariat and the principle of geographical distribution
154	15 November 1947	without vote	Proposal for the adoption of Spanish as one of the working languages of the General Assembly
155	15 November 1947	without vote	Appointment of an Investments Committee
156	15 November 1947	without vote	United Nations Staff Benefit Committee appointment of alternate members
157	20 November 1947	without vote	International Children's Emergency Fund: audit of the accounts for the fiscal year 1946
158	20 November 1947	without vote	United Nations telecommunications system
159	20 November 1947	without vote	Organization of a United Nation Postal Service
160	20 November 1947	without vote	Tax equalization
161	20 November 1947	without vote	Provisional staff regulations and staff rules
162	20 November 1947	without vote	United Nations Joint Staff Pension Scheme
163	20 November 1947	without vote	Provisional Financial Regulations of the United Nations
164	20 November 1947	40-0-7	Supplementary estimates for the financial year 1947
165	20 November 1947	without vote	Budgetary and financial relations with specialized agencies
166	20 November 1947		Budget of the United Nations for the financial year 1948
167	20 October 1947	without vote	United Nations Flag
168	31 October 1947	without vote	United Nations Day
169	31 October 1947	without vote	Agreement between the United Nations and the United States of America regarding the Headquarters of the United Nations
170	31 October 1947	42-7-6	Surrender of war criminals and traitors
171	14 November 1947		Need for greater use by the United Nations and its organs of the International Court of Justice
172	14 November 1947	unanimously	Registration and publication of treaties and international agreements
173	17 November 1947		Part III of the report of the Committee on Procedures and Organization of the General Assembly approving rules of procedure
174	21 November 1947	44-0-6	Establishment of an International Law Commission
175	21 November 1947	without vote	Preparation by the Secretariat of the work of the International Law Commission
176	21 November 1947	48-0-7	Teaching of international law
177	21 November 1947	42-1-8	Formulation of the principles recognized in the Charter of the Nuremberg Tribunal and in the judgment of the Tribunal
178	21 November 1947	without vote	Draft declaration on the rights and duties of States
179	21 November 1947		Co-ordination of the privileges and immunities of the United Nations and of the specialized agencies
180	21 November 1947	38-0-14	Draft convention on genocide
181	29 November 1947		Future government of Palestine
182	20 November 1947	without vote	Headquarters of the United Nations
183	20 October 1947	45-1-9	Utilization of the services of the Secretariat
184	15 November 1947	32-17-5	Place of meeting of the 3rd regular session General Assembly
