= Oxford Manual =

Oxford Manual can refer to:

- any of several editions of Hart's Rules, a style guide published under such names as The Oxford Style Manual (2003) and New Oxford Style Manual (2012, 2016).
- Laws of War on Land (Oxford 1880), an 1880 treatise on the Law of War drawn up by the Institute of International Law.
