= Complex equality =

Michael Walzer

Complex equality is a theory of justice outlined by Michael Walzer in his 1983 work Spheres of Justice. It is considered innovative because of its emphasis on the broader conceptualization of distribution, which covers not only tangible goods but also abstract goods such as rights. The theory is distinguished from simple equality since it allows certain inequalities in social goods.

== Theory ==
The theory posits that inequalities in several spheres of society should not invade one another. Walzer's definition of complex equality is: "In formal terms, complex equality means that no citizen's standing in one sphere or with regard to one social good can be undercut by his standing in some other sphere, with regard to some other good." In this state of affairs, there are variety of goods and these are distributed according to the appropriate principles that are inherent in their social meanings. The idea is that the resulting multiple inequalities that consistently do not favor any group serve as the equalizer. A reading of Waltzer's notion is that it is culturally relative. For instance, in the case of a caste society, complex equality is characterized by the integration of meanings attached to goods in all spheres, effectively subjecting prestige, wealth, office, occupation, clothing, food, and knowledge to the same hierarchy.

== Influence ==
Transport planner and theorist Karel Martens in 2012 applied Waltzer's complex equality to transport planning suggesting accessibility should form a separate distributive sphere. Martens paralleled Waltzer's idea that inequalities in wealth should not automatically translate into inequalities in people's ability to reach destinations. Martens suggests accessibility need not be equal for everyone, but its distribution should follow principles appropriate to its social meaning rather than be determined by advantages in money.

== See also ==
- Equality of opportunity
