= Interpretation and Social Criticism =

1987 book by Michael Walzer

- Author: Michael Walzer
- Language: English
- Subject: Political philosophy
- Publisher: Harvard University Press
- Publication date: 1987
- Publication place: United States
- Media type: Print (hardcover · paperback)
- Pages: 108 (1993 Harvard University Press edition)
- ISBN: 978-0-674-45971-7

Interpretation and Social Criticism is a 1987 book about political philosophy by Michael Walzer.

== Reception ==
Interpretation and Social Criticism has, together with Just and Unjust Wars (1977) and Spheres of Justice (1983), been identified as one of Walzer's most important works by the philosopher Will Kymlicka.
