= Alberta Culture Days =

Festival of events in Canada

Alberta Culture Days (formerly Alberta Arts Days) is a month-long celebration of arts, heritage, diversity and community spirit, hosted by community organizations. It is an opportunity for all Albertans to discover, experience and celebrate arts and culture by attending or hosting local events and activities across the province. The first three years of Alberta Arts Days occurred during the third Friday, Saturday and Sunday of September before shifting to align with the pan-Canadian Culture Days. The purpose of Alberta Culture Days is to showcase the province's artists, art organizations and community organizations encourage Albertans and its visitors to engage in the arts, and promote the importance of arts and culture as part of a prosperous and vibrant province.

== Background ==
The first Alberta Arts Days occurred in 1974 during a three-day arts celebration in Red Deer, Alberta and coincided with the creation of Alberta's first Ministry of Culture, but was not implemented into an annual event.
In 2008, Alberta Arts Days was reinitiated by the province's Ministry of Culture and Community Spirit. Governed by The Spirit of Alberta, Alberta's cultural policy, Alberta Arts Days helped the Ministry achieve one of its stated goals to "Ensure Albertans, throughout the province, have access to a wide range of cultural experiences and opportunities." Albertans are encouraged to plan arts related events during the weekend, while others incorporate an artistic element to a project or event that is already planned.

In 2009, Alberta Arts Days changed from a single-day event to a three-day celebration. The event's name was changed to Alberta Culture Days in 2012. In 2020 Alberta Culture Days changed from a 3 day event to events taking place throughout the month of September.

== See also ==
- Ontario Culture Days
