= Problem of dirty hands =

Concept in moral and political philosophy

The problem of dirty hands concerns whether political leaders are justified in committing immoral actions when "dirtying their hands", in realizing an important moral end, such as the preservation of a community's continued existence or the prevention of imminent societal catastrophe.

== Walzer and Williams on dirty hands ==
Contemporary philosophical interest in the problem of dirty hands had been popularized by the works of American political theorist Michael Walzer and other thinkers. The term itself comes from Jean-Paul Sartre's 1948 play Dirty Hands, in which Hoederer speaks of having dirty hands up to his elbows, then asks, "But what do you hope? Do you think you can govern innocently?"

Walzer argued that, in cases of "supreme emergency" in which a political community's continued existence is in imminent danger, its leaders might be obligated to dirty their hands and sanction gravely immoral actions for the sake of saving the community. Discussing the British bombing campaigns against German cities from 1940 to 1942, Walzer wrote:

[I]t does seem to me that the more certain a German victory appeared to be in the absence of a bomber offensive, the more justifiable was the decision to launch the offensive. It is not just that such a victory was frightening, but also that it seemed in those years very close; it is not just that it was close, but also that it was so frightening. Here was a supreme emergency where one might well be required to override the rights of innocent people and shatter the war convention. Given the view of Nazism that I am assuming, the issue takes this form: should I wager this determinate crime (the killing of innocent people) against that immeasurable evil (a Nazi triumph)?

British philosopher Bernard Williams explored the problem of dirty hands in less hyperbolic situations, more the everyday necessities of political life than the extraordinary undertakings of defending one's community from outright destruction: "[I]t is a predictable and probable hazard of public life that there will be these situations in which something morally disagreeable is clearly required. To refuse on moral grounds ever to do anything of that sort is more than likely to mean that one cannot seriously pursue even the moral ends of politics".

== Martin Hollis on dirty hands ==
Martin Hollis, an English philosopher, also wrote about the dirty hands problem. He described the Glencoe Massacre as an example. The act of committing murder under trust was a punishable offense and the order "should not have been given nor, once given, obeyed." However, Hollis points out the utilitarian value of making a "bloody example" as a warning to the other chieftains. He said this was not a question of whether the ends justify the means because the other strategies to unify the nation may have had equally bad consequences. The value of uniting the country makes this a problem of dirty hands because the leaders involved had to make an ethically questionable decision for what they believed would promote the greater good. Hollis argues that politics is the art of compromise, and "the best is the enemy of the good."

Another example of the problem of dirty hands, Hollis mentions, is the decision Winston Churchill made in World War II not to warn the people of Coventry that the Germans were planning a massive air raid on their city. At first glance, it seems wrong that he would send no warning, but had he done so, the Germans would have known that the British had broken their Enigma cipher, which Hollis argues Churchill believed to be a greater loss in the long term. Historians have since viewed Churchill's alleged knowledge of the Coventry bombing as false.

== See also ==
- State of exception (Agamben)—a related concept, the state of exception involves the suspension of the rule of law, which can be compared to the suspension of the rule of morality in "supreme emergencies"
- Consequentialism
- Deontology
