= Menachem Lorberbaum =

Israeli philosopher and scholar of Jewish thought

- מנחם לורברבוים
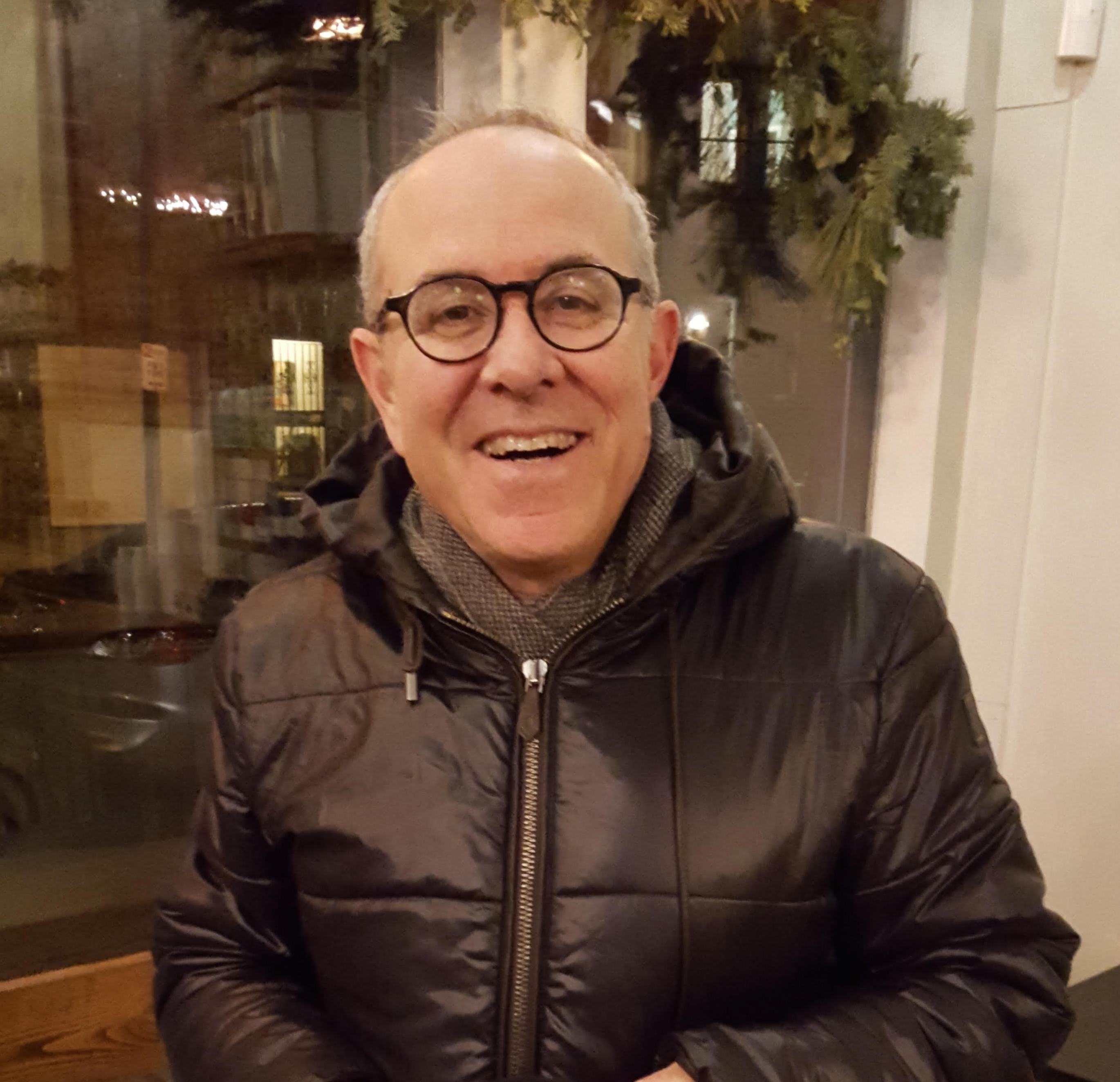
- Born: March 14, 1958 (age 68); New York City, U.S.

Academic background
- Education: Hebrew University of Jerusalem (PhD, 1993)
- Thesis: Politics and the Limits of Law in Medieval Jewish Thought: Maimonides and Nissim Gerondi (1993)
- Doctoral advisors: Aviezer Ravitzky; Michael Walzer

Academic work
- Discipline: Philosophy
- Sub-discipline: Jewish philosophy; Medieval philosophy; Political philosophy; Philosophy of religion
- Institutions: Tel Aviv University; Shalom Hartman Institute
- Main interests: Jewish law; Religion and politics; Maimonides; Nissim of Gerona

Menachem Lorberbaum (Hebrew: מנחם לורברבוים; born March 14, 1958) is an Israeli philosopher and scholar of Jewish thought and the chair of the School of Philosophy at Tel Aviv University.

== Biography ==
Menachem Lorberbaum completed his PhD in 1993 under the joint supervision of Aviezer Ravitzki of the Hebrew University and Michael Walzer of the Institute for Advanced Study in Princeton with a dissertation entitled: Politics and the Limits of Law in Jewish Medieval Thought. While writing his dissertation, he was invited to be a fellow at the School of Social Science at the Institute for Advanced Study in Princeton, where he stayed for three years.

== Academic career ==
He was the founding chair of the Department of Hebrew Culture Studies at Tel Aviv University. He is a senior fellow at the Shalom Hartman Institute in Jerusalem. Lorberbaum studies political theory and the connection between religion, state, and politics in the Jewish tradition.

== Published works ==
Lorberbaum is the author of Politics and the Limits of Law (Stanford 2001; Hebrew: 2006) and We are Dazzled by His Beauty (Hebrew, Ben Zvi Institute 2011). Together with Professors Michael Walzer of Princeton and Noam Zohar of Bar-Ilan, he is a senior editor of the Jewish Political Tradition series (vol. 1 Authority, Yale University Press 2000, Hebrew: 2007; vol. 2 Membership, Yale University Press 2003; vol. 3 Community, Yale University Press, forthcoming). He is editor of the new and first complete Hebrew translation of Thomas Hobbes' Leviathan (Shalem 2009). Lorberbaum has also published three volumes of Hebrew verse and is together with Michal Govrin, editor of the Devarim poetry series of Carmel publishers that published his book of poetic translations Transpositions. He is on the editorial board of the Hebraic Political Studies journal.
