= Spheres of Justice =

1983 book by Michael Walzer

Spheres of Justice: A Defense of Pluralism and Equality
- Author: Michael Walzer
- Language: English
- Subject: Complex equality
- Publisher: Basic Books
- Publication date: 1983
- Publication place: United States
- Media type: Print
- ISBN: 0-465-08189-4

Spheres of Justice: A Defense of Pluralism and Equality is a 1983 book by the political theorist Michael Walzer.

== Summary ==
Walzer explores the concept of distributive justice, which concerns the fair allocation of goods and resources in society. He argues against the idea of a single universal principle of justice that can be applied uniformly across all spheres of life. Instead, he suggests that different social goods should be distributed according to different principles, taking into account the specific characteristics and values of each sphere.

Walzer argues in favour of an idea he calls "complex equality", and against the view that goods with different meaning and content can be lumped together into the larger category of primary goods, as is advocated by John Rawls, in his A Theory of Justice (1971). According to Walzer, each sphere has its own internal logic and should be governed by distinct principles of distribution that reflect the particular goods and values at stake.

== Reception ==
Spheres of Justice has, together with Just and Unjust Wars (1977) and Interpretation and Social Criticism (1987), been identified as one of Walzer's most important works by the philosopher Will Kymlicka.

== Influence ==
Walzer’s concept of distributive spheres has been applied to transport planning by Karel Martens. Martens used Walzer's theory to state that accessibility (the ability to reach destinations) should be its own separate distributive sphere in which allocation is governed by deliberate distributive policies rather than the distribution of money and financial assets.
