= Michael Walzer =

American philosopher (born 1935)

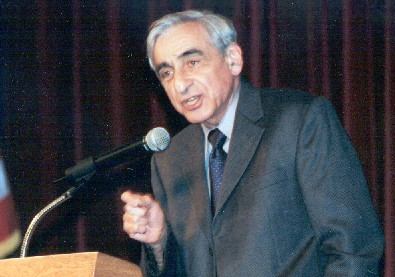
- Walzer in 2002
- Born: Michael Laban Walzer; March 3, 1935 (age 91); New York City, US
- Spouse: Judith Borodovko Walzer (m. 1956)
- Children: 2

Academic background
- Education: Brandeis University; University of Cambridge; Harvard University
- Thesis: The Revolution of the Saints
- Doctoral advisor: Samuel Beer
- Other advisors: Geoffrey Elton; Frank E. Manuel
- Influences: Isaiah Berlin; Charles Taylor; Albert Camus; Karl Marx; John Rawls; Niccolò Machiavelli

Academic work
- Discipline: Philosophy; political studies
- Sub-discipline: Political philosophy; ethics
- School or tradition: Analytic philosophy; communitarianism; socialism
- Institutions: Institute for Advanced Study
- Doctoral students: Menachem Lorberbaum
- Notable students: Joshua B. Freeman; Amy Gutmann; Michael W. Doyle; Ian Shapiro
- Main interests: Human rights; political ethics; just war theory; liberalism; value pluralism; social criticism; internationalism
- Notable works: Just and Unjust Wars (1977); Spheres of Justice (1983); Interpretation and Social Criticism (1987)
- Notable ideas: Dirty hands; complex equality; supreme emergency
- Influenced: Michael Sandel; Jean Bethke Elshtain; Amy Gutmann; Michael W. Doyle; Ian Shapiro; Axel Honneth; Rainer Forst

Michael Laban Walzer (Note: Pronounced /ˈwɔːlzər/) (born March 3, 1935) is an American political theorist and public intellectual. A professor emeritus at the Institute for Advanced Study (IAS) in Princeton, New Jersey, he is editor emeritus of the left-wing magazine Dissent, which he has been affiliated with since his years as an undergraduate at Brandeis University, an advisory editor of the Jewish journal Fathom, and sits on the editorial board of the Jewish Review of Books.

He has written books and essays on a wide range of topics—many in political ethics—including just and unjust wars, nationalism, ethnicity, Zionism, antisemitism, economic justice, social criticism, radicalism, tolerance, and political obligation. He is also a contributing editor to The New Republic. To date, he has written 27 books and published over 300 articles, essays, and book reviews in Dissent, The New Republic, The New York Review of Books, The New Yorker, The New York Times, Harpers, Quillette, and many philosophical and political science journals.

== Early life and education ==
Born to a Jewish family on March 3, 1935, Walzer graduated summa cum laude from Brandeis University in 1956 with a Bachelor of Arts degree in history. He then studied at the University of Cambridge on a Fulbright Fellowship (1956–1957) and completed his doctoral work at Harvard University, earning his Doctor of Philosophy degree in government under Samuel Beer in 1961.

== Work ==
Walzer is usually identified as one of the leading proponents of the communitarian position in political theory, along with Alasdair MacIntyre and Michael J. Sandel. Like Sandel and MacIntyre, Walzer is not completely comfortable with this label. However, he has long argued that political theory must be grounded in the traditions and culture of particular societies, and has long opposed what he sees to be the excessive abstraction of political philosophy.

His most important intellectual contributions include Just and Unjust Wars (1977), a revitalization of just war theory that insists on the importance of "ethics" in wartime while eschewing pacifism; the theory of "complex equality", which holds that the metric of just equality is not some single material or moral good, but rather that egalitarian justice demands that each good be distributed according to its social meaning, and that no good (like money or political power) be allowed to dominate or distort the distribution of goods in other spheres; and an argument that justice is primarily a moral standard within particular nations and societies, not one that can be developed in a universalized abstraction.

In Spheres of Justice (1983), Walzer argued that different social goods should be distributed according to principles reflecting their distinct social meanings. Walzer's “complex equality” permits inequalities within individual spheres but opposes allowing advantages in one sphere, such as wealth or political power, to determine the distribution of goods in others.

In On Toleration, he describes various examples of (and approaches to) toleration in various settings, including multinational empires such as Rome; nations in past and current-day international society; "consociations" such as Switzerland; nation-states such as France; and immigrant societies such as the United States. He concludes by describing a "post-modern" view, in which cultures within an immigrant nation have blended and inter-married to the extent that toleration becomes an intra-familial affair.

=== Influence ===
Walzer's ideas on distributive spheres has influenced Karel Martens's theories on transport justice and his suggestion that accessibility should be distributed independently of wealth.

== Employment ==
Walzer was first employed in 1962 in the politics department at Princeton University. He stayed there until 1966, when he moved to the government department at Harvard. He taught at Harvard until 1980, when he became a permanent faculty member in the School of Social Science at the Institute for Advanced Study.

In 1971, Walzer taught a semester-long course at Harvard with Robert Nozick called "Capitalism and Socialism". The course was a debate between the two philosophers: Nozick's side is delineated in Anarchy, State, and Utopia (1974), and Walzer's side is expressed in his Spheres of Justice (1983), in which he argues for "complex equality".

== Awards and honors ==
In April 2008, Walzer received the prestigious Spinoza Lens, a biennial prize for ethics in the Netherlands. He has also been honoured with an emeritus professorship at the prestigious Institute for Advanced Study. He was elected to a Fellowship of the American Academy of Arts & Sciences in 1971, a member of the American Philosophical Society in 1990, and to a Corresponding Fellowship of the British Academy in 2016.

== Personal life ==
Walzer is married to Judith Borodovko Walzer. They are parents of two daughters.

Walzer is the older brother of historian Judith Walzer Leavitt.

== Books ==
- The Revolution of the Saints: A Study in the Origins of Radical Politics (Harvard University Press, 1965) ISBN 0-674-76786-1
- Obligations: Essays on Disobedience, War and Citizenship (Harvard University Press, 1970) ISBN 0-674-63025-4
- Political Action (Quadrangle Books, 1971) ISBN 0-8129-0173-8
- Regicide and Revolution (Cambridge University Press, 1974) ISBN 0-231-08259-2
- Just and Unjust Wars (Basic Books, 1977; second edition, 1992; third edition, 2000, ISBN 0-465-03705-4; fourth edition, 2006, ISBN 0-465-03707-0); fifth edition, 2015.
- Radical Principles (Basic Books, 1977) ISBN 0-465-06824-3
- Spheres of Justice (Basic Books, 1983) ISBN 0-465-08189-4
- Exodus and Revolution (Basic Books, 1985) ISBN 0-465-02164-6
- Interpretation and Social Criticism (Harvard University Press, 1987) ISBN 0-674-45971-7
- The Company of Critics (Basic Books, 1988) ISBN 0-465-01331-7
- Zivile Gesellschaft und amerikanische Demokratie (Rotbuch Verlag, 1992) ISBN 3-596-13077-8 (collection of essays in German collection; the title translates as "Civil Society and American Democracy")
- What It Means to Be an American (Marsilio Publishers, 1992) ISBN 1-56886-025-0
- Thick and Thin: Moral Argument at Home and Abroad (Notre Dame Press, 1994) ISBN 0-268-01897-9
- Pluralism, Justice and Equality, with David Miller (Oxford University Press, 1995) ISBN 0-19-828008-4
- Toward a Global Civil Society (Berghahn Books, 1995) ISBN 1-57181-054-4
- On Toleration (Yale University Press, 1997) ISBN 0-268-01897-9
- Arguments from the Left (Atlas, 1997, in Swedish)
- Pluralism and Democracy (Editions Esprit, 1997, in French) ISBN 2-909210-19-7
- Reason, Politics, and Passion (Fischer Taschenbuch Verlag, 1999, in German) ISBN 3-596-14439-6
- The Jewish Political Tradition, Vol. I: Authority. co-edited with Menachem Lorberbaum, Noam Zohar, and Yair Lorberbaum (Yale University Press, 2000) ISBN 0-300-09428-0
- Exilic Politics in the Hebrew Bible (Mohr Siebeck, 2001, in German) ISBN 3-16-147543-7
- War, Politics, and Morality (Ediciones Paidos (es), 2001, in Spanish) ISBN 84-493-1167-5
- The Jewish Political Tradition, Vol. II: Membership. Co-edited with Menachem Lorberbaum, Noam Zohar, and Yair Lorberbaum (Yale University Press, 2003) ISBN 978-0-300-09428-2
- Arguing About War (Yale University Press, 2004) ISBN 0-300-10365-4
- Politics and Passion: Toward A More Egalitarian Liberalism (Yale University Press, 2004) ISBN 0-300-10328-X
- Law, Politics, and Morality in Judaism. edited by Walzer (Princeton University Press, 2006) ISBN 0-691-12508-2
- Thinking Politically (Yale University Press, 2007) ISBN 978-0-300-11816-2
- In God's Shadow: Politics in the Hebrew Bible (Yale University Press, 2012) ISBN 978-0-300-18044-2
- The Paradox of Liberation (Yale University Press, 2015) ISBN 978-0-300-18780-9
- A Foreign Policy for the Left (Yale University Press, 2018) ISBN 978-0300223873
- Political Action: A Practical Guide to Movement Politics (New York Review Books Classics, 2019)
- The Struggle for a Decent Politics: On "Liberal" as an adjective (Yale University Press, 2023)

== See also ==
- Hugo Grotius
- Thomas Nagel
- John Rawls
- Richard Rorty
- Emer de Vattel

== Notes ==
Academic offices
Preceded by	Tanner Lecturer on Human Values at Harvard University; 1985–1986	Succeeded by Jürgen Habermas
