= Stories of Peace award =

Peace award

- Awarded for: Peace advocacy (videography)
- Date: September, near International Day of Peace
- Location: Bancroft, Ontario
- Country: Canada
- Presented by: Canadian Peace Museum
- Rewards: Trophy and $500
- First award: 2023
- Website: canadianpeacemuseum.ca/awards

The Stories of Peace award is an annual award organized by the Canadian Peace Museum.

== Organization ==
The Stories of Peace award is organized by the Canadian Peace Museum. Entrants submit videos to answer the question "What does peace mean to you?" in the lead up to September 21, International Day of Peace.

The awarding decision is made by a judging panel.

A maple wood trophy and $500 prize are presented at an award ceremony in Bancroft, Ontario. In 2023 and 2024, the Government of Canada and the Government of Ontario issued congratulatory scrolls to the winners.

== History ==
The award was launched in 2023 and the first award ceremony took place in the Bancroft Village Playhouse where Bird's Creek School became the first winner.

In 2024, entries were received from participants Canada and Bangladesh. The award ceremony took place in the Bancroft Village Playhouse and featured photography by Nicolò Filippo Rosso. The 2024 award ceremony won the Best In-Person Program Spotlight Award from Ontario Culture Days.

The 2025 award ceremony took place on September 21st, International Day of Peace and featured musical performances by Della Dupuis and Landyn Vivie. The ceremony included the launch of national and local peace awards. The National Community Peace Award was won by Peace Train Canada. Local Community Peace Awards were won by the Tweed Peace Project, North Hastings Community Trust, St John's Anglican Church and Grace Inn, and the Weekend Meals for the Unhoused organization. Erin Crecelius won a Local Peace Advocate Award, For the Halibut fish & chip restaurant won the Local Business Peace Award, and Joseph Shulman won a Lifetime Achievement Award.

== Winners ==
Year	Awardee	Runner up/Honorable mention(s)	Source(s)
2023	Birds Creek School (video)	Gattuor Loch Bakam (video)	
2024	Coe Hill Public School (video)	Katie Baklinski, Peace is Food Grown in Safety. Enough for Everyone (watercolour painting); and Brynn Duggan, Peace is a Protest (video)	
2025	Lex Pacificatoria podcast	Aquil Virani; Jessica Estay; and Madoc Township Public School’s Grade 6/7 class	
