= Brian Orend =

Canadian philosopher

Brian Orend is the Director of International Studies and a professor of Philosophy at the University of Waterloo in Waterloo, Ontario.

Orend's works focus on just war theory and human rights. He is best known for his discussions of jus post bellum (justice after war), which deals with the termination phase of war.

== Works ==
- War and International Justice: A Kantian Perspective (Wilfrid Laurier University Press, 2000)
- Michael Walzer on War and Justice (McGill-Queen's University Press, 2001)
- Human Rights: Concept and Context (Broadview Press, 2002)
- The Morality of War (Broadview Press, June 2006)
- "War", The Stanford Encyclopedia of Philosophy (Online: Fall 2008 Edition)

== See also ==
- List of University of Waterloo people
