= Laws of War on Land =

1880 codification of the laws of warfare

The Laws of War on Land, often known as the Oxford Manual, was an early effort to publish a comprehensive treatise on the Law of War. It was principally drafted by Gustave Moynier, president of the International Committee of the Red Cross and founder of the Institute of International Law, and unanimously approved by the board of that institute at a conference at Oxford on September 9, 1880. The manual itself was not an international treaty with any binding legal status, and Argentina and Serbia were the only countries to adopt it as national law. Nevertheless, its philosophical and jurisprudential stances remained influential in European popular discourse (if not among governments or militaries), and most of its provisions were eventually formally adopted into the Hague and Geneva Conventions. The 1904 Nobel Peace Prize was awarded to the Institute largely on the basis of this contribution "to make the laws of war more humane".

== Origins ==
Czar Alexander II of Russia convened a conference of fifteen European powers in Brussels in July 1874 to study a proposed international agreement on the laws and customs of war. The delegates to the conference issued a declaration of their shared values and intent, but could not agree on a binding treaty. In the aftermath of the conference, the Institute of International Law agreed to take on the project of further developing the ideas of the Brussels Declaration into a form suitable for government adoption and more easily interpretable by non-lawyer military personnel, culminating in the Oxford Manual of 1880. This project has been described as "the first comprehensive international code of the law of armed conflict" and was highly influential on the subsequent Hague Convention process that finally led to binding treaties starting in 1899.
