= Christine Bell =

British legal scholar

Christine Bell, FBA, FRSE, is a legal scholar specialising in human rights law, and a senior mediator with over 30 years of experience mediating violent conflict. She was principle investigator and Director of large-scale research grants establishing the Political Settlements Research Programme and the Peace and Conflict Resolution Platform (PeaceRep). As of 2026, she is Emeritus Professor of Constitutional Law at the University of Edinburgh, and Honorary Professor The Institute for Global Peace, Security and Justice, Queen's University of Belfast.

== Education and Professional Life ==
Bell graduated from Selwyn College, Cambridge, with a first class law degree in 1988, before completing a master of laws degree at Harvard University in 1990. She qualified as a Barrister in Northern Ireland in that year and, after passing the New York bar examination, she worked at Debevoise & Plimpton. She was then Director of the Centre for International and Comparative Human Rights Law at Queen's University Belfast from 1997 to 1999, and then Professor of Public International Law at the University of Ulster from 2000 to 2011.

== Intellectual Contributions ==
Bell has made major contributions on the nature and status of peace agreements, arguing that they operate as a category of legalized document, with legal and political effects. One of Bell's contributions is the concept of the lex pacificatoria. This is the idea that the practice of conflict resolution has created new forms of legal consensus relating to how issues such as powersharing, minority rights, and transitional justice are dealt with in peace agreements or accords.

Bell has also been the lead researcher responsible for the PA-X Peace and Transition Data, and has innovated in the PeaceTech area. She has pioneered 'Peace Analytics' as a concept, and also been key to peacetech developments.

== Honours ==
In 2015, Bell was elected a Fellow of the British Academy (FBA), the United Kingdom's national academy for the humanities and social sciences. In 2019 she was elected a Fellow of the Royal Society of Edinburgh. She won the Francis Deák Prize of the American Society of International Law in 2007. In 2011 she was awarded the UK Society of Legal Scholars Hart/SLSA Book Prize for her book 'On the Law of Peace'. Bell and the PA-X team were awarded the RSE'S Mary Sommerville Medal for their work on peace and transition process data.

== Selected works ==
- PeaceTech: Digital Transformation to End Wars, 2nd Ed (Palgrave Macmillan, 2026)
- PA-X Peace and Transition Process data.
- (With John Morison) Tall Stories?: Reading Law and Literature (Dartmouth Publishing, 1996).
- (With Marie Fox) Learning Legal Skills (Blackstone Press, 1999).
- Peace Agreements and Human Rights (Oxford University Press, 2000).
- On the Law of Peace: Peace Agreements and the Lex Pacificatoria (Oxford University Press, 2008)
- (With Vanessa Utley) Chronology of Mindanao Peace Agreements (Political Settlements Research Programme, 2015).
- (With Helia Farahnoosh) Chronology of the Peace Process and Peace Agreements between the Philippines and the National Democratic Front (Political Settlements Research Programme, 2015).
- (With Catherine O'Rourke and Sissela Matzner) A Chronology of Colombian Peace Processes and Peace Agreements (Political Settlements Research Programme, 2015).
- (With Celia Davies, Kimana Zulueta-Fuelscher, Asanga Welikala and Sumit Bisarya) Interim Constitutions in Post-Conflict Settings (International Idea, 2015).
- Governance and Law: The Distinctive Context of Transitions from Conflict and its Consequences for Development Interventions (Political Settlements Research Programme, 2015)
- Unsettling Bargains?: Power-sharing and the Inclusion of Women in Peace Negotiations (Political Settlements Research Programme, 2015).
- Text and Context: Evaluating Peace Agreements for their "Gender Perspective" (Political Settlements Research Programme, 2015).
- (With Jenna Sapiano, Kimana Zulueta-Fülscher, Sumit Bisarya and Asanga Welikala) Constitution-Building in Political Settlement Processes: The Quest for Inclusion (International Idea, 2016).
- Transitional Justice (Routledge, 2016).
- (With Kimana Zulueta-Fuelscher) Sequencing Peace Agreements and Constitutions in the Political Settlement Process (International Institute for Democracy and Electoral Assistance, 2016).
