= United Nations General Assembly Resolution 177 (II) =

UN General Assembly Resolution 177, 21 November 1947 - Formulation of the principles recognised in the London Charter of the Nuremberg Tribunal and in the judgement of the tribunal.

Under Resolution 177 (II), paragraph (a), the International Law Commission was directed to "formulate the principles of international law recognized in the Charter of the Nuremberg Tribunal and in the judgment of the Tribunal." From this resolution the Nuremberg Principles were created.
