= Tom Dannenbaum =

American legal scholar

Tom Dannenbaum is an American associate professor of International Law at the Fletcher School of Law & Diplomacy in Medford, Massachusetts, US.

== Works ==
- Dannenbaum, Tom (2010). "Translating the Standard of Effective Control into a System of Effective Accountability: How Liability Should Be Apportioned for Violations of Human Rights by Member State Troop Contingents Serving as United Nations Peacekeepers". Harvard International Law Journal. 51: 113.
- Dannenbaum, Tom (2018). The Crime of Aggression, Humanity, and the Soldier. Cambridge University Press. ISBN 978-1-107-16918-0.
