= Jus post bellum =

"Justice after war"

Jus post bellum (/juːs/ YOOS; Latin for "justice after war") is a concept that deals with the morality of the termination phase of war, including the responsibility to rebuild. The idea has some historical pedigree as a concept in just war theory. In modern times, it has been developed by a number of just war theorists and international lawyers. The concept means different things to the contributors in each field. For international lawyers, the concept is much less clearly defined, and some have counselled caution in the use of the jus post bellum concept. The concept continues to attract scholarly interest in the fields of transitional justice, post-conflict law, and international humanitarian law.

There are many case studies of jus post bellum. A famous example of is the reconstruction of Germany by the Allies post World War 2. A more modern example is the Special Jurisdiction for Peace in Colombia.

== Background ==
Brian Orend cites Immanuel Kant as the first to consider a three-pronged approach to the morality of armed conflict and concluded that a third branch of just war theory, the morality of the termination phase of war, had been overlooked. It is true, though, that it is possible to see traces of the jus post bellum in the writings of other classic authors, such as St. Augustine, Francisco de Vitoria, Francisco Suárez, Alberico Gentili and Hugo Grotius.

Just war theorists and other moral and political theorists may find it useful to draw upon the writings of these scholars to think about post-war issues, such as rehabilitation, reconstruction, and reparations. For international lawyers, these writings should be handled with care. It must be remembered that these classical scholars were writing in a radically different context. As Professor Robert Cryer argued:

'Although we may like what is said (or we may not), methodological issues need to be thought through with respect to direct reliance on such writers in terms of our understanding of the law [...] any similarities may turn out to be what translators call "false friends", terms that although they look similar mean very different things' (p. 226)

The modern jus post bellum came to prominence around the time of the U.S. invasion of Iraq. Some jus post bellum scholarship was aimed at fixing perceived problems with the legal framework that applied in post-intervention situations, e.g., in the law of occupation. These suggestions drew from Kantian ideas of democratic peace to call for a new legal regime which would deal in toto with post-conflict legal issues. Other lawyers, such as Eric de Brabandere argued: ‘the very reason the laws of occupation are inadequate to deal with comprehensive post-conflict reconstruction missions […] is precisely the reason for their existence, namely to limit the occupier’s powers in a territory for which the occupier has no title.’ (p. 119)

A related concept to the jus post bellum is the lex pacificatoria, as developed by Professor Christine Bell. This may be defined as the law of the peacemakers which emerges from peace agreement practice and it may be said to introduce the jus post bellum phase.

== Purpose ==
The purpose of the jus post bellum and its usefulness depends on whether it is considered as a moral or a legal concept.

As a concept in just war theory, the jus post bellum debate considers a number of issues:

- terms for the end of war; once the rights of a political community have been vindicated, further continuation of war becomes an act of aggression.
- guidelines for the construction of peace treaties.
- guidelines for the political reconstruction of defeated states.
- prevention of draconian and vengeful peace terms; the rights a just state fights for in a war provide the constraints on what can be demanded from the defeated belligerent.
- rules for occupation

Thus, the areas within which jus post bellum applies can include restraining conquest; political reconstruction, especially in the case of genocide and war crimes; and economic reconstruction, including restoration and reparations.

As a legal concept, the jus post bellum may be understood as:

(i) an umbrella term that denotes all the applicable law in a post-conflict situation (descriptive);

(ii) a new form of law that includes new rules for dealing with certain post-conflict situations (normative);

(iii) an interpretive concept that identifies principles which may be used to interpret the already existing law (normative).

== See also ==
- Jus ad bellum
- Jus in bello
- Peace treaty
