= Canadian Peace Museum =

- Established: 21 September 2026; 2 months ago
- Location: Valleyview Drive, Bancroft, Ontario, Canada
- Coordinates: 45.053°N 77.875°W
- Type: Peace museum
- Founders: Chris Houston, Sara Wolfe
- Executive director: Chris Houston
- Website: canadianpeacemuseum.ca

The Canadian Peace Museum is peace museum located in Bancroft, Ontario.

It launched in 2026.

== Building and design ==
The museum occupies a two-floor 8,000 square-foot building on Valleyview Drive, Bancroft. The building was given to the museum by the North Hastings Community Trust in 2025.

The Museum Planners Group undertook the design of the museum. Renovations to open the museum were ongoing in April 2026 and are supported by donors including Canadian Friends Service Committee.

== Activities ==
The museum hosts a events, a community garden, and the annual Stories of Peace Awards.

The museum launched on International Day of Peace, September 21, 2026. Exhibits include content on Truth and Reconciliation, peacemaking, atomic weapons, environmental peacebuilding, humanitarian aid and international solidarity.

== Administration ==
The museum is led by former humanitarian worker Chris Houston, who is a co-founder and the executive director. Sara Wolfe is also a co-founder.

The organization is a registered charity.
