= Just war theory =

Doctrine about when a war is ethically just

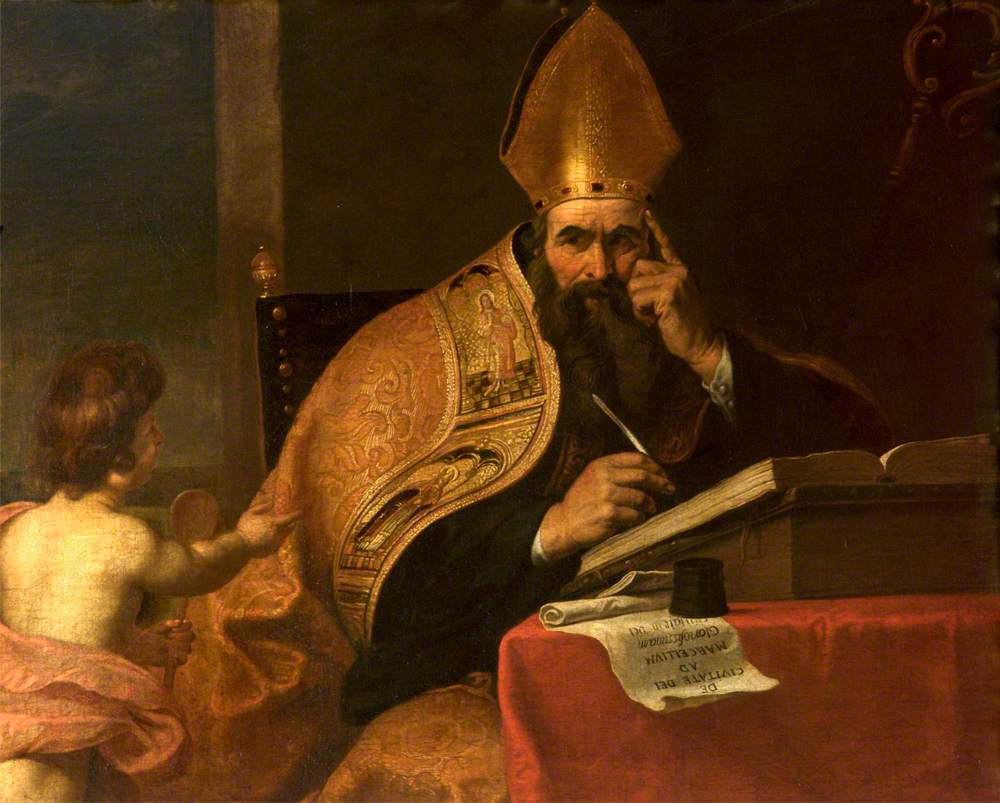
Church Father Saint Augustine was the first clear advocate of just-war theory.

The just war theory (Latin: bellum iustum) is a doctrine, also referred to as a tradition, of military ethics that aims to ensure that a war is morally justifiable through a series of criteria, all of which must be met for a war to be considered just. It has been studied by military leaders, theologians, ethicists and policymakers. The criteria are split into two groups: jus ad bellum ("right to go to war") and jus in bello ("right conduct in war"). There have been calls for the inclusion of a third category of just war theory (jus post bellum) dealing with the morality of post-war settlement and reconstruction. The just war theory postulates that war, while it is terrible but less so with the right conduct, is not always the worst option, but justifiable when justice is an objective of armed conflict. Important responsibilities, undesirable outcomes, or preventable atrocities may justify war.

Opponents of the just war theory may either be inclined to a stricter pacifist standard (proposing that there has never been nor can there ever be a justifiable basis for war) or they may be inclined toward a more permissive nationalist standard (proposing that a war need only to serve a nation's interests to be justifiable). In many cases, philosophers state that individuals do not need to be plagued by a guilty conscience if they are required to fight. A few philosophers ennoble the virtues of the soldier while they also declare their apprehensions for war itself. A few, such as Rousseau, argue for insurrection against oppressive rule.

The historical aspect, or the "just war tradition", deals with the historical body of rules or agreements that have applied in various wars across the ages. The just war tradition also considers the writings of various philosophers and lawyers through history, and examines both their philosophical visions of war's ethical limits and whether their thoughts have contributed to the body of conventions that have evolved to guide war and warfare.

In the twenty-first century there has been significant debate between traditional just war theorists, who largely support the existing law of war and develop arguments to support it, and revisionists who reject many traditional assumptions, although not necessarily advocating a change in the law.

== Origins ==
=== Ancient Egypt ===
A 2017 study found that the just war tradition can be traced as far back as to Ancient Egypt. Egyptian ethics of war usually centered on three main ideas, these including the cosmological role of Egypt, the pharaoh as a divine office and executor of the will of the gods, and the superiority of the Egyptian state and population over all other states and people. Egyptian political theology held that the pharaoh had the exclusive legitimacy in justly initiating a war, usually claimed to carry out the will of the gods. Senusret I, in the Twelfth Dynasty, claimed, "I was nursed to be a conqueror...his [Atum's] son and his protector, he gave me to conquer what he conquered." Later pharaohs also considered their sonship of the god Amun-Re as granting them absolute ability to declare war on the deity's behalf. Pharaohs often visited temples prior to initiating campaigns, where the pharaoh was believed to receive their commands of war from the deities. For example, Kamose claimed that "I went north because I was strong (enough) to attack the Asiatics through the command of Amon, the just of counsels." A stele erected by Thutmose III at the Temple of Amun at Karnak "provides an unequivocal statement of the pharaoh's divine mandate to wage war on his enemies." As the period of the New Kingdom progressed and Egypt heightened its territorial ambition, so did the invocation of just war aid the justification of these efforts. The universal principle of Maat, signifying order and justice, was central to the Egyptian notion of just war and its ability to guarantee Egypt virtually no limits on what it could take, do, or use to guarantee the ambitions of the state.

=== India ===
The Indian Hindu epic, the Mahabharata, offers the first written discussions of a "just war" (dharma-yuddha or "righteous war"). In it, one of five ruling brothers (Pandavas) asks if the suffering caused by war can ever be justified. A long discussion then ensues between the siblings, establishing criteria like proportionality (chariots cannot attack cavalry, only other chariots; no attacking people in distress), just means (no poisoned or barbed arrows), just cause (no attacking out of rage), and fair treatment of captives and the wounded.

In Sikhism, the term dharamyudh describes a war that is fought for just, righteous or religious reasons, especially in defence of one's own beliefs. Though some core tenets in the Sikh religion are understood to emphasise peace and nonviolence, especially before the 1606 execution of Guru Arjan by Mughal Emperor Jahangir, military force may be justified if all peaceful means to settle a conflict have been exhausted, thus resulting in a dharamyudh.

=== East Asian ===
Chinese philosophy produced a massive body of work on warfare, much of it during the Zhou dynasty, especially the Warring States era. War was justified only as a last resort and only by the rightful sovereign; however, questioning the decision of the emperor concerning the necessity of a military action was not permissible. The success of a military campaign was sufficient proof that the campaign had been righteous.

Japan did not develop its own doctrine of just war but between the 5th and the 7th centuries drew heavily from Chinese philosophy, and especially Confucian views. As part of the Japanese campaign to take the northeastern island Honshu, Japanese military action was portrayed as an effort to "pacify" the Emishi people, who were likened to "bandits" and "wild-hearted wolf cubs" and accused of invading Japan's frontier lands.

=== Ancient Greece and Rome ===
The notion of just war in Europe originates and is developed first in ancient Greece and then in the Roman Empire.

It was Aristotle who first introduced the concept and terminology to the Hellenic world that called war a last resort requiring conduct that would allow the restoration of peace. Aristotle argues that the cultivation of a military is necessary and good for the purpose of self-defense, not for conquering: "The proper object of practising military training is not in order that men may enslave those who do not deserve slavery, but in order that first they may themselves avoid becoming enslaved to others" (Politics, Book 7).

Stoic philosopher Panaetius considered war inhuman, but contemplated just war when it was impossible to bring peace and justice by peaceful means. Just war could be waged solely for retribution or defense, in both cases having to be declared officially. He also established the importance of treating the defeated in a civilized way, especially those who surrendered, even after a prolonged conflict.

In ancient Rome, a "just cause" for war might include the necessity of repelling an invasion, or retaliation for pillaging or a breach of treaty. War was always potentially nefas ("wrong, forbidden"), and risked religious pollution and divine disfavor. A "just war" (bellum iustum) thus required a ritualized declaration by the fetial priests. More broadly, conventions of war and treaty-making were part of the ius gentium, the "law of nations", the customary moral obligations regarded as innate and universal to human beings.

=== Christian views ===
Christian Just War thinking is often thought to begin with Saint Ambrose, Bishop of Milan, before being developed further by his contemporary Saint Augustine of Hippo. The Just War theory, with some amendments, is still used by Christians today as a guide to whether or not a war can be justified, and how it should be fought. Christians may argue "Sometimes war may be necessary and right, even though it may not be good." In the case of a country that has been invaded by an occupying force, for example, war may be the only way to restore justice.

==== Saint Ambrose ====
Influenced by Roman law, and Cicero in particular, Ambrose believed that war was legitimate only for defensive purposes or the punishment of serious wrongdoing, and rulers were obliged to respect treaties, avoid exploiting enemies and treat the defeated with mercy. Ambrose also seems to have regarded military force as permissible against heretics, or in support of Christian orthodoxy. Nevertheless, he strictly prohibited the Church from direct involvement in violence, insisting that clergy must not take up arms themselves. Similarly, warfare had to be undertaken only to fulfill divine law, not for personal motives, and any war driven by emotional excess, vindictiveness or other disordered intentions fell outside the moral limits he envisioned.

==== Saint Augustine ====
Saint Augustine held that Christians should not resort immediately to violence, but that God has given the sword to governments for a good reason (based upon Romans 13:4). In Contra Faustum Manichaeum book 22 sections 69–76, the main source for his just war ideas, Augustine argues that Christians, as part of a government, need not be ashamed of protecting peace and punishing wickedness when they are obliged to do so. Augustine regarded intention as the main determinant of whether a war was just or sinful: "What is here required is not a bodily action, but an inward disposition. The sacred seat of virtue is the heart."

Nonetheless, Augustine asserted that peaceful inaction in the face of a grave wrong that could be rectified only by violence would be a sin. Defense of oneself or the innocent could therefore be a necessity, especially when authorized by a legitimate state authority:

They who have waged war in obedience to the divine command, or in conformity with His laws, have represented in their persons the public justice or the wisdom of government, and in this capacity have put to death wicked men; such persons have by no means violated the commandment, "Thou shalt not kill."

But, say they, the wise man will wage Just Wars. As if he would not all the rather lament the necessity of just wars, if he remembers that he is a man; for if they were not just he would not wage them, and would therefore be delivered from all wars.

No war is undertaken by a good state except on behalf of good faith or for safety.

According to J. Mark Mattox:

In terms of the traditional notion of jus ad bellum [the circumstances under which wars can be justly fought] ... war is a coping mechanism for righteous sovereigns who would ensure that their violent international encounters are minimal, a reflection of the Divine Will to the greatest extent possible, and always justified. In terms of the traditional notion of jus in bello [justice in war, or the moral considerations which ought to constrain the use of violence in war], war is a coping mechanism for righteous combatants who, by divine edict, have no choice but to subject themselves to their political masters and seek to ensure that they execute their war-fighting duty as justly as possible.

To summarize, Augustine explored the relationship between Christian charity and the use of force in greater philosophical depth than Ambrose, though he ultimately affirmed many of the same principles. Augustine did not attempt to craft a systematic doctrine of just war, and his comments on it are scattered across his writing. Even so, the foundations of what later became the classical just war tradition can be clearly identified in his thought.

For Augustine, as for Ambrose, war could also be understood as analogous to a judicial process, in which the political authority uses war to punish those who commit injustice. Indeed, he compared military action to civil litigation seeking restitution or punitive redress. Since God was the ultimate judge, and there were Old Testament precedents for His ordering of wars against Israel's enemies and unbelievers, just war could also become holy war or religious war.

Several core just war principles emerge from Augustine's writing:

Legitimate authority: Only public authorities may wage war; private individuals have no right to initiate armed conflict.

Just cause: Defense of the community, protection of allies, or redress for wrongful acts are just causes for war, though Augustine also allowed for offensive action under certain circumstances, citing Moses’ expulsion of the Amorites after they denied Israel peaceful passage.

Right intention: Proper inner disposition is essential. A ruler or soldier must act with a mindset comparable to that of a Christian judge or executioner—firm yet guided by love and compassion. Actions motivated by revenge, wrath, or greed invalidate any claim to justice in war.

Finally, the ultimate goal of just war must be to establish peace.

==== Saint Isidore of Seville ====
Isidore of Seville writes:

Those wars are unjust which are undertaken without cause. For aside from vengeance or to fight off enemies no just war can be waged.

Isidore offers a succinct definition of just war in his Etymologiae, describing it as a conflict “waged by formal declaration, either to recover seized property or to drive off an enemy”. He immediately contrasts this with unjust war, following ideas drawn from Cicero's De re publica. Although Isidore's brief, essentially Roman, formulation did not fully engage with Augustine's more sophisticated thinking, and did not fully incorporate subsequent Christian or post-Roman developments, it nevertheless became, like the writings of Saint Gregory of Tours, an important conduit through which the conception of just war entered the high medieval period, informing the Decretum of Gratian in particular.

==== Carolingian period ====
The just war ideas of Saint Augustine of Hippo and other Church Fathers were transmitted via Saint Isidore of Seville, Saint Gregory of Tours and other scholars into the Carolingian period, informing the Christianizing imperial project of Charlemagne and the consequent Carolingian Renaissance. Just/holy war ideas about legitimate authority, just cause, punishment of enemies/unbelievers and the establishment of peace therefore gained traction, though traditional Christian concerns, particularly among clerics, about the sinfulness of killing in war, or being killed in a state of sin, were reflected in sermons, liturgies and penitential texts. This led to increasing deployment of military chaplains to enable soldiers to confess their sins, and thereby reconcile themselves with God, before battle. Proto-jus in bello rules to protect non-combatants such as clergy, nuns, widows, orphans and the poor, including their property, also began to appear in ecclesiastical texts, as well as some capitularies (laws or ordinances) issued by Charlemagne and other rulers, anticipating the later Peace of God, and Truce of God movements.

==== Peace and Truce of God ====
The medieval Peace of God (Latin: pax dei) was a 10th-century mass movement in Western Europe instigated by the clergy that granted immunity from violence for non-combatants.

Starting in the 11th Century, the Truce of God (Latin: treuga dei) involved Church rules that successfully limited when and where fighting could occur: Catholic forces (e.g. of warring barons) could not fight each other on Sundays, Thursdays, holidays, the entirety of Lent and Advent and other times, severely disrupting the conduct of wars. The 1179 Third Council of the Lateran adopted a version of it for the whole church.

==== Saint Thomas Aquinas ====
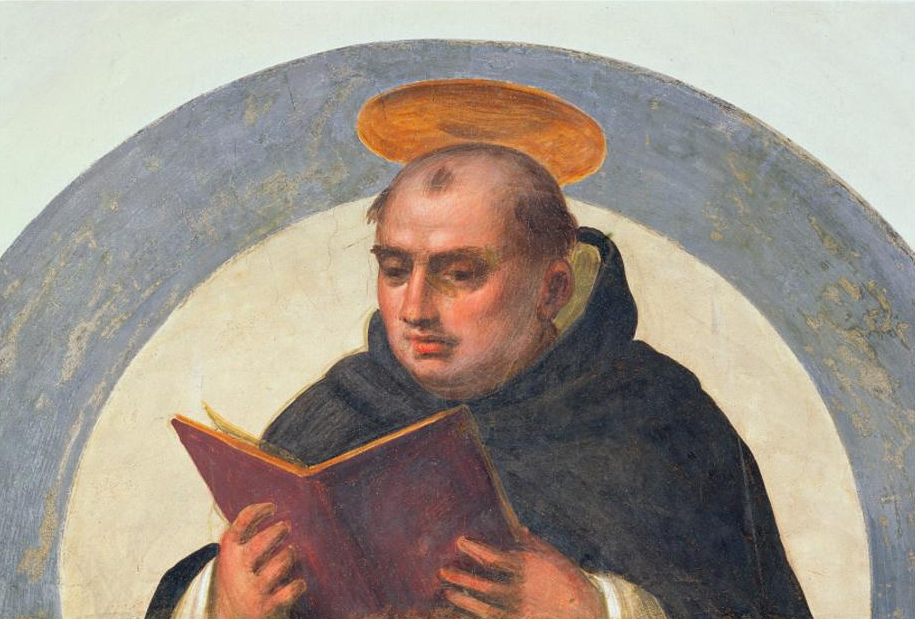
Saint Thomas Aquinas contributed to the development of the just war theory in medieval Europe.

The just war theory by Saint Thomas Aquinas has had a lasting impact on later generations of thinkers and was part of an emerging consensus in medieval Europe on just war. In the 13th century Aquinas reflected in detail on peace and war. Aquinas was a Dominican friar and contemplated the teachings of the Bible on peace and war in combination with ideas from Aristotle, Plato, Socrates, Saint Augustine and other philosophers whose writings are part of the Western canon. Aquinas' views on war drew heavily on the Decretum Gratiani, a book the Italian monk Gratian had compiled with passages from the Bible. After its publication in the 12th century, the Decretum Gratiani had been republished with commentary from Pope Innocent IV and the Dominican friar Raymond of Penafort. Other significant influences on Aquinas just war theory were Alexander of Hales and Henry of Segusio.

In Summa Theologica Aquinas asserted that it is not always a sin to wage war, and he set out criteria for a just war. According to Aquinas, three requirements must be met. Firstly, the war must be waged upon the command of a rightful sovereign. Secondly, the war needs to be waged for just cause, on account of some wrong the attacked have committed. Thirdly, warriors must have the right intent, namely to promote good and to avoid evil. Aquinas came to the conclusion that a just war could be offensive and that injustice should not be tolerated so as to avoid war. Nevertheless, Aquinas argued that violence must only be used as a last resort. On the battlefield, violence was only justified to the extent it was necessary. Soldiers needed to avoid cruelty and a just war was limited by the conduct of just combatants. Aquinas argued that it was only in the pursuit of justice, that the good intention of a moral act could justify negative consequences, including the killing of the innocent during a war.

==== The school of Salamanca ====
In the 15th and 16th centuries, members of the Spanish School of Salamanca, built upon Aquinas' just war theories and the classical doctrines of just war, notably applying them to the Spanish colonization of the Americas. In Vitoria's De Indis, he states that both individuals and states can wage wars of self defense, but that wars of religion or enlargement of empire are not just. He also included consideration on whether the good which comes from a war exceeds the harm in determinations of whether or not a war is just.

==== Renaissance and Christian Humanists ====
Various Renaissance humanists promoted Pacificist views.

- John Colet famously preached a Lenten sermon before Henry VIII, who was preparing for a war, quoting Cicero "Better an unjust peace rather than the justest war."
- Erasmus of Rotterdam wrote numerous works on peace which criticized Just War theory as a smokescreen and added extra limitations, notably The Complaint of Peace and the Treatise on War (Dulce bellum inexpertis).

A leading humanist writer after the Reformation was legal theorist Hugo Grotius, whose De jura belli ac pacis re-considered Just War and fighting wars justly.

==== First World War ====
At the beginning of the First World War, a group of theologians in Germany published a manifesto that sought to justify the actions of the German government. At the British government's request, Randall Davidson, Archbishop of Canterbury, took the lead in collaborating with a large number of other religious leaders, including some with whom he had differed in the past, to write a rebuttal of the Germans' contentions. Both German and British theologians based themselves on the just war theory, each group seeking to prove that it applied to the war waged by its own side.

==== Contemporary Catholic doctrine ====
The just war doctrine of the Catholic Church found in the 1992 Catechism of the Catholic Church, in paragraph 2309, lists four strict conditions for "legitimate defense by military force:"

- The damage inflicted by the aggressor on the nation or community of nations must be lasting, grave and certain.
- All other means of putting an end to it must have been shown to be impractical or ineffective.
- There must be serious prospects of success.
- The use of arms must not produce evils and disorders graver than the evil to be eliminated.

The Compendium of the Social Doctrine of the Church elaborates on the just war doctrine in paragraphs 500 to 501, while citing the Charter of the United Nations:

If this responsibility justifies the possession of sufficient means to exercise this right to defense, States still have the obligation to do everything possible "to ensure that the conditions of peace exist, not only within their own territory but throughout the world". It is important to remember that "it is one thing to wage a war of self-defense; it is quite another to seek to impose domination on another nation. The possession of war potential does not justify the use of force for political or military objectives. Nor does the mere fact that war has unfortunately broken out mean that all is fair between the warring parties".

The Charter of the United Nations ... is based on a generalized prohibition of a recourse to force to resolve disputes between States, with the exception of two cases: legitimate defence and measures taken by the Security Council within the area of its responsibilities for maintaining peace. In every case, exercising the right to self-defence must respect "the traditional limits of necessity and proportionality".

Therefore, engaging in a preventive war without clear proof that an attack is imminent cannot fail to raise serious moral and juridical questions. International legitimacy for the use of armed force, on the basis of rigorous assessment and with well-founded motivations, can only be given by the decision of a competent body that identifies specific situations as threats to peace and authorizes an intrusion into the sphere of autonomy usually reserved to a State.

— Compendium of the Social Doctrine of the Church

Pope John Paul II in an address to a group of soldiers noted the following:

Peace, as taught by Sacred Scripture and the experience of men itself, is more than just the absence of war. And the Christian is aware that on earth a human society that is completely and always peaceful is, unfortunately, an utopia and that the ideologies which present it as easily attainable only nourish vain hopes. The cause of peace will not go forward by denying the possibility and the obligation to defend it.

==== Evangelical-Lutheran Churches ====
The Evangelical-Lutheran Churches affirm just war doctrine; it was formulated by Martin Luther:

1. A war can be considered just if it has just authority; this means that it has the injunction of the "God-given calling of ruler, emperor, head of state, and bearer of the sword in the civil realm"
2. A just war must have just cause and right intention; just war is defensive, whereas unjust war is offensive

Martin Luther states that “Worldly government has not been instituted by God to break the peace and start war, but to maintain peace and to avoid war.” In a just war, combatants should be distinguished from non-combatants; "when victory has been achieved, one should offer mercy and peace to those who surrender and humble themselves."

Christians, according to Evangelical-Lutheran theology, are not obligated to obey civil authorities when they wage a war that is unjust, since moral duty requires obedience to God above all.

==== Russian Orthodox Church ====
The War and Peace section in the Basis of the Social Concept of the Russian Orthodox Church is crucial for understanding the Russian Orthodox Church's attitude towards war. The document offers criteria of distinguishing between an aggressive war, which is unacceptable, and a justified war, attributing the highest moral and sacred value of military acts of bravery to a true believer who participates in a justified war. Additionally, the document considers the just war criteria as developed in Western Christianity to be eligible for Russian Orthodoxy; therefore, the justified war theory in Western theology is also applicable to the Russian Orthodox Church.

In the same document, it is stated that wars have accompanied human history since the fall of man, and according to the gospel, they will continue to accompany it. While recognizing war as evil, the Russian Orthodox Church does not prohibit its members from participating in hostilities if there is the security of their neighbours and the restoration of trampled justice at stake. War is considered to be necessary but undesirable. It is also stated that the Russian Orthodox Church has had profound respect for soldiers who gave their lives to protect the life and security of their neighbours.

=== Just war tradition ===
The just war theory, propounded by the medieval Christian philosopher Thomas Aquinas, was developed further by legal scholars in the context of international law. Cardinal Cajetan, the jurist Francisco de Vitoria, the two Jesuit priests Luis de Molina and Francisco Suárez, as well as the humanist Hugo Grotius and the lawyer Luigi Taparelli were most influential in the formation of a just war tradition. The just war tradition, which was well established by the 19th century, found its practical application in the Hague Peace Conferences (1899 and 1907) and in the founding of the League of Nations in 1920. After the United States Congress declared war on Germany in 1917, Cardinal James Gibbons issued a letter that all Catholics were to support the war because "Our Lord Jesus Christ does not stand for peace at any price... If by Pacifism is meant the teaching that the use of force is never justifiable, then, however well meant, it is mistaken, and it is hurtful to the life of our country."

Armed conflicts such as the Spanish Civil War, World War II and the Cold War were, as a matter of course, judged according to the norms (as established in Aquinas' just war theory) by philosophers such as Jacques Maritain, Elizabeth Anscombe and John Finnis.

The first work dedicated specifically to just war was the 15th-century sermon De bellis justis of Stanisław of Skarbimierz (1360–1431), who justified war by the Kingdom of Poland against the Teutonic Knights. Francisco de Vitoria criticized the conquest of America by the Spanish conquistadors on the basis of just-war theory. With Alberico Gentili and Hugo Grotius, just war theory was replaced by international law theory, codified as a set of rules, which today still encompass the points commonly debated, with some modifications.

Just-war theorists combine a moral abhorrence towards war with a readiness to accept that war may sometimes be necessary. The criteria of the just-war tradition act as an aid in determining whether resorting to arms is morally permissible. Just-war theories aim "to distinguish between justifiable and unjustifiable uses of organized armed forces"; they attempt "to conceive of how the use of arms might be restrained, made more humane, and ultimately directed towards the aim of establishing lasting peace and justice".

The just war tradition addresses the morality of the use of force in two parts: when it is right to resort to armed force (the concern of jus ad bellum) and what is acceptable in using such force (the concern of jus in bello).

In 1869 the Russian military theorist Genrikh Antonovich Leer theorized on the advantages and potential benefits of war.

The Soviet leader Vladimir Lenin defined only three types of just war.

But picture to yourselves a slave-owner who owned 100 slaves warring against a slave-owner who owned 200 slaves for a more "just" distribution of slaves. Clearly, the application of the term "defensive" war, or war "for the defense of the fatherland" in such a case would be historically false, and in practice would be sheer deception of the common people, of philistines, of ignorant people, by the astute slaveowners. Precisely in this way are the present-day imperialist bourgeoisie deceiving the peoples by means of "national ideology" and the term "defense of the fatherland" in the present war between slave-owners for fortifying and strengthening slavery.

The anarcho-capitalist scholar Murray Rothbard (1926–1995) stated that "a just war exists when a people tries to ward off the threat of coercive domination by another people, or to overthrow an already-existing domination. A war is unjust, on the other hand, when a people try to impose domination on another people or try to retain an already-existing coercive rule over them."

Jonathan Riley-Smith writes:

The consensus among Christians on the use of violence has changed radically since the crusades were fought. The just war theory prevailing for most of the last two centuries—that violence is an evil that can, in certain situations, be condoned as the lesser of evils—is relatively young. Although it has inherited some elements (the criteria of legitimate authority, just cause, right intention) from the older war theory that first evolved around AD 400, it has rejected two premises that underpinned all medieval just wars, including crusades: first, that violence could be employed on behalf of Christ's intentions for mankind and could even be directly authorized by him; and second, that it was a morally neutral force that drew whatever ethical coloring it had from the intentions of the perpetrators.

== Criteria ==
The just war theory has two sets of criteria, the first establishing jus ad bellum (the right to go to war), and the second establishing jus in bello (right conduct within war).

=== Jus ad bellum ===
The just war theory directs jus ad bellum to norms that aim to require certain circumstances to enable the right to go to war.

Competent authority
Only duly constituted public authorities may wage war. "A just war must be initiated by a political authority within a political system that allows distinctions of justice. Dictatorships (e.g. Hitler's regime) or deceptive military actions (e.g. the 1969 US bombing of Cambodia) are typically considered as violations of this criterion. The importance of this condition is key. Plainly, we cannot have a genuine process of judging a just war within a system that represses the process of genuine justice. A just war must be initiated by a political authority within a political system that allows distinctions of justice".
Probability of success
According to this principle, there must be good grounds for concluding that aims of the just war are achievable. This principle emphasizes that mass violence must not be undertaken if it is unlikely to secure the just cause. This criterion is to avoid invasion for invasion's sake and links to the proportionality criteria. One cannot invade if there is no chance of actually winning. However, wars are fought with imperfect knowledge, so one must simply be able to make a logical case that one can win; there is no way to know this in advance. These criteria move the conversation from moral and theoretical grounds to practical grounds. Essentially, this is meant to gather coalition building and win approval of other state actors.
Last resort
The principle of last resort stipulates that all non-violent options must first be exhausted before the use of force can be justified. Diplomatic options, sanctions, and other non-military methods must be attempted or validly ruled out before the engagement of hostilities. Further, in regard to the amount of harm—proportionally—the principle of last resort would support using small intervention forces first and then escalating rather than starting a war with massive force such as carpet bombing or nuclear warfare.
Just cause
The reason for going to war needs to be just and cannot, therefore, be solely for recapturing things taken or punishing people who have done wrong; innocent life must be in imminent danger and intervention must be to protect life. A contemporary view of just cause was expressed in 1993 when the US Catholic Conference said: "Force may be used only to correct a grave, public evil, i.e., aggression or massive violation of the basic human rights of whole populations."

=== Jus in bello ===
Once war has begun, just war theory (jus in bello) also directs how combatants are to act or should act:

Distinction
Just war conduct is governed by the principle of distinction. The acts of war should be directed towards enemy combatants, and not towards non-combatants caught in circumstances that they did not create. The prohibited acts include bombing civilian residential areas that include no legitimate military targets, committing acts of terrorism or reprisal against civilians or prisoners of war (POWs), and attacking neutral targets. Moreover, combatants are not permitted to attack enemy combatants who have surrendered, or who have been captured, or who are injured and not presenting an immediate lethal threat, or who are parachuting from disabled aircraft and are not airborne forces, or who are shipwrecked.
Proportionality
Just war conduct is governed by the principle of proportionality. Combatants must make sure that the harm caused to civilians or civilian property is not excessive in relation to the concrete and direct military advantage anticipated by an attack on a legitimate military objective. This principle is meant to discern the correct balance between the restriction imposed by a corrective measure and the severity of the nature of the prohibited act.
Military necessity
Just war conduct is governed by the principle of military necessity. An attack or action must be intended to help in the defeat of the enemy; it must be an attack on a legitimate military objective, and the harm caused to civilians or civilian property must be proportionate and not excessive in relation to the concrete and direct military advantage anticipated. Jus in bello allows for military necessity and does not favor a specific justification in allowing for counter-attack recourse. This principle is meant to limit excessive and unnecessary death and destruction.
Fair treatment of prisoners of war
Enemy combatants who surrendered or who are captured no longer pose a threat. It is therefore wrong to torture them or otherwise mistreat them.
No means malum in se
Combatants may not use weapons or other methods of warfare that are considered evil, such as mass rape, forcing enemy combatants to fight against their own side or using weapons whose effects cannot be controlled (e.g., nuclear/biological weapons).

=== Jus post bellum ===
In recent years, some theorists, such as Gary Bass, Louis Iasiello and Brian Orend, have proposed a third category within the just war theory. "Jus post bellum is described by some scholars as a new "discipline," or as "a new category of international law currently under construction". Jus post bellum concerns justice after a war, including peace treaties, reconstruction, environmental remediation, war crimes trials, and war reparations. Jus post bellum has been added to deal with the fact that some hostile actions may take place outside a traditional battlefield. Jus post bellum governs the justice of war termination and peace agreements, as well as the prosecution of war criminals, and publicly labelled terrorists. The idea has largely been used to help decide what to do with prisoners taken during battle. It is through government labeling and public opinion that people use jus post bellum to justify the pursuit of individuals labeled as terrorists for the safety of the government's state in a modern context. The actual fault lies with the aggressor, and by being the aggressor, they forfeit their rights to honorable treatment by their actions. That theory is used to justify the actions taken by anyone fighting in a war to treat prisoners outside the bounds of war.

== Traditionalists and revisionists ==
There are two altering views related to the just war theory that scholars align with, which are traditionalists and revisionists. The debates between these different viewpoints rest on the moral responsibilities of actors in jus in bello.

=== Traditionalists ===
In the just war theory as it pertains to jus in bello, traditionalist scholars view that the two principles, jus ad bellum and jus in bello, are distinct in which actors in war are morally responsible. The traditional view places accountability on leaders who start the war, while soldiers are accountable for actions breaking jus in bello.

=== Revisionists ===
Revisionist scholars view that moral responsibility in conduct of war is placed on individual soldiers who participate in war, even if they follow the rules associated with jus in bello. Soldiers that participate in unjust wars are morally responsible. The revisionist view is based on an individual level, rather than on a collective whole.

Additionally, the distinctive methodologies associated with the use of nuclear weapons to wage mass war in the modern era, have also led some "nonreductive" revisionists to question the relevance the just war theory itself. Such particular criticisms are more limited in scope, however, than the generalized objections which have been raised by both realists and pacifists.

== See also ==
- Appeasement
- Christian pacifism
- Cost–benefit analysis
- Deterrence theory
- Peace and conflict studies
- Right of conquest
- Moral equality of combatants
- Supreme emergency
- Military applications of artificial intelligence
