= Jus ad bellum =

Law governing the right to use force

Jus ad bellum (/juːs/ YOOS or /dʒʌs/, Latin pronunciation: [ˈjuːs ad ˈbɛllʊ̃]), literally "right to war" in Latin, is the law governing the right to use force and the permissibility of going to war. The term refers to "the conditions under which States may resort to war or to the use of armed force in general." Jus ad bellum is one pillar of just war theory. Just war theory states that war should only be condoned under 'just' conditions. Jus ad bellum simply limits the causes for which war can be considered justifiable. The other parts of just war theory include jus in bello (just actions in war) and jus post bellum (justice after war).

== Historical background ==
The history of jus ad bellum is rooted in ancient religious thought and philosophical tradition, with concepts resembling the modern criteria for justified warfare appearing across a range of early civilisations. These foundational ideas evolved over centuries to form the basis of the contemporary legal framework governing the resort to war.

=== Ancient history ===
Many of the ancient civilizations have shown some degree of understanding of just war. One example can be found in Ancient Egypt. Early Egyptians viewed themselves as the cosmological center of civility. Therefore they put their faith in the gods alongside the pharaoh to have just reasons to engage in war. These include self defense, defense of their allies and against evil powers. Beyond the Egyptians, there have also been tracings of these core just war and jus ad bellum elements in Ancient Mesopotamia, Anatolia, and the Levant.

=== Christian just war ===
Many philosophers in the early centuries have dabbled in defining what is ethically and morally acceptable in war. St. Augustine is considered to be the father of just war theory. St. Augustine was a Nicene Christian who constructed an early framework for just war from a Christian perspective. Augustine is widely regarded as a foundational figure in the development of just war theory, articulating criteria such as just cause, right intention, and legitimate authority.

St. Thomas Aquinas later contributed significantly to just war theory with his Summa Theologiae. Aquinas lists criteria from the Christian perspective that were intended to protect civilians and guarantee that wars were not just fought for the interest of private parties.

=== Renaissance period ===
Francisco de Vitoria and Hugo Grotius grew the idea of just war theory into international law. Vitoria's main argument presented that war should serve the common good. States should not be going to war for revenge or power. Hugo Grotius was another key thinker within the evolution of just war. He has been named father of international law. In his work, On the Law of War and Peace, Grotius emphasized the need for proportionality and accountability.

=== Modern international law ===
==== Early 20th Century ====
The League of Nations was one of the first international organizations established with a primary goal of maintaining world peace. It was established in 1920 after World War I in order to protect the world from dealing with such tragedies again. Unfortunately, it was entirely unsuccessful in that mission owing to the occurrence of World War II.

The League achieved some meaningful successes during its existence, including the resolution of several territorial disputes, and early frameworks for humanitarian and health cooperation. However, it proved ultimately insufficient to prevent the outbreak of World War II, undermined by the absence of major powers including the United States, the withdrawal of key member states, and its lack of effective enforcement mechanisms.

==== United Nations Charter ====
Following the end of World War II, the United Nations was established with a primary purpose of maintaining international peace and security. It sought to address the weaknesses that undermined the effectiveness of the League of Nations, and to prevent the outbreak of another world war.

In the UN Charter, Article 2, paragraph 4 states: "All Members shall refrain in their international relations from the threat or use of force against the territorial integrity or political independence of any State, or in any other manner inconsistent with the purposes of the United Nations." Article 51 of the UN Charter later clarifies: "Nothing in the present Charter shall impair the inherent right of individual or collective self-defense if an armed attack occurs against a Member of the United Nations." These put the idea of jus ad bellum into writing by requiring states to agree that they will only use armed force in self-defense, or with the approval of the United Nations Security Council.

==== Cyberspace ====
One of the more recent topics being discussed in scholarship is the application of international law in the realm of cyberspace. Cyber attacks continue to increase in frequency and severity across the globe, driving discussion of jurisdiction of cyber crimes, seeking clarity regarding, e.g. justification of the use of military force in response to cyber attacks.

== Core principles ==
=== Just cause ===
Just cause is the foundational criterion of jus ad bellum. It requires that there be a sufficiently serious reason to justify resorting to armed force. Broadly accepted just causes include self-defence in response to armed attack, the defence of others from aggression, and, in more contested contemporary doctrine, humanitarian intervention to halt grave atrocities such as genocide or crimes against humanity. Wars fought solely to annex territory, exact revenge, or impose regime change are not considered to meet this standard.

Contemporary doctrines of anticipatory self-defence and preemptive strikes, sometimes associated with the Bush Doctrine, have generated significant debate about the boundaries of just cause, particularly regarding whether a threatened but not yet executed attack can satisfy this criterion.

The responsibility to protect doctrine has further developed the concept of just cause in the context of humanitarian intervention, establishing that the international community may have grounds to act when a state fails to protect its own population from mass atrocities.

=== Right intention ===
Right intention requires that the motivating purpose for war aligns with the stated just cause. A war may have a valid just cause but still fail this criterion if it is pursued for ulterior motives such as territorial gain, economic advantage, or political dominance. The aim of a justly intended war must be to restore a just and durable peace that is preferable to the conditions that would have prevailed had the war not occurred.

=== Legitimate authority ===
Legitimate authority generally requires that war be initiated and conducted by a sovereign state. This authority is what differentiates war from murder: "[i]t is the rules of warfare that give the practice meaning, that distinguish war from murder and soldiers from criminals." Thus, a soldier is treated as a prisoner of war and not a criminal because they are operating under the proper authority of the state and cannot be held individually responsible for actions committed under the orders of their military leadership.

==== Declarations of war ====
Historically, the principle of legitimate authority required declarations of war. For example, in his Summa Theologica St. Thomas Aquinas notes that to be a just war, war has not only to be declared publicly, but also must be declared by the proper authority. Similarly, section III of the Hague Convention of 1907 required hostilities to be preceded by a reasoned declaration of war or by an ultimatum with a conditional declaration of war.

In the period following World War I, the Kellogg–Briand Pact of 1928 attempted to curtail the right of signatories to unilaterally declare war, stating that "the settlement or solution of all disputes or conflicts of … shall never be sought except by pacific means."

The United Nations Charter, negotiated following World War II, included a number of provisions, to similar effect. For example, Article 2 requires that member-states "settle their international disputes by peaceful means" and "refrain in their international relations from the threat or use of force against the territorial integrity or political independence of any state".

Since the 1950s, declarations of jus ad bellum have dropped dramatically. This may be because the cost of complying with international humanitarian law has increased, incentivising states to avoid admitting they are in a formal state of war.

=== Probability of success ===
According to this principle, there must be good grounds for concluding that aims of the just war are achievable. This principle emphasizes that mass violence must not be undertaken if it is unlikely to secure the just cause. This criterion is to avoid invasion for invasion's sake and links to the proportionality criteria. One cannot invade if there is no chance of actually winning. However, wars are fought with imperfect knowledge, so one must simply be able to make a logical case that one can win; there is no way to know this in advance. These criteria move the conversation from moral and theoretical grounds to practical grounds.

=== Last resort ===
The principle of last resort stipulates that all non-violent options must first be exhausted before the use of force can be justified. Diplomatic options, sanctions, and other non-military methods must be attempted or validly ruled out before the engagement of hostilities. Further, in regard to the amount of harm—proportionally—the principle of last resort would support using small intervention forces first and then escalating rather than starting a war with massive force such as carpet bombing or nuclear warfare.

=== Proportionality ===
The principle of Proportionality is the idea of maintaining a balance. The desire to go to war must balance with the destruction or loss of life that the war will cause. If one is more than the other that is a breach in proportionality. There should never be extreme damage and loss of life for a cause that isn't equally productive.

== See also ==
- Jus in bello
- Casus belli
- Jus post bellum
- Si vis pacem, para bellum
- Just war theory
- List of Latin phrases
- Mandatory war
