= The Lexington Principles on the Rights of Detainees =

Soft-law codification project

- Created: April 1, 2009
- Location: Lexington, Virginia, United States
- Author(s): The Lexington Principles Project, Transnational Law Institute, Washington and Lee University School of Law, Institute for Honor
- Purpose: Detainee rights, Due process, human rights

The Lexington Principles on the Rights of Detainees (Lexington Principles) is a body of international due process principles that reflect the prevailing transnational norms in the area of detainee treatment. The Lexington Principles were completed and published on April 1, 2009. The instrument consists of 45 principles and countless annotations prepared by the project's law student editorial board. A primary purpose of the drafters of the Lexington Principles was to assist the jurisprudential evolution of American constitutional due process standards after the U.S. Supreme Court's decision in Boumediene v. Bush. While each Principle is based on international law, all provisions have been drafted to facilitate vertical norm internalization into the domestic legal system of the United States and other common law countries.

== History ==
=== Mission of the Lexington Principles Project ===
"The mission of the Lexington Principles Project is to engage the international community to clarify and strengthen transnational norms pertaining to due process of law and the treatment of persons detained on suspicion of terrorist activities, and to foster a common approach to these matters, in keeping with the recommendation of the 9/11 Commission on this subject.".

=== The 9/11 Commission ===
On July 22, 2004, the 9/11 Commission issued its report on the terrorist attacks of September 11, 2001. In this report, the commission made numerous recommendations to U.S. government officials on how to better defend the United States against the spread of international terrorism. In reference to detainee treatment standards, the Commission recommended that:

"(t)he United States should engage its friends to develop a common coalition approach toward the detention and humane treatment of captured terrorists. New principles might draw upon Article 3 of the Geneva Conventions on the law of armed conflict. That article was specifically designed for those cases in which the usual laws of war did not apply. Its minimum standards are generally accepted throughout the world as customary international law.".

The White House responded to the 9-11 Commission's recommendation with the following statement:

"The United States has worked closely with its coalition partners regarding the detention and treatment of captured terrorists, and is open to exploring whether a "common coalition approach" is feasible and consistent with our national security.".

Seventeen months later the 9/11 Commission met again to grade the government's progress on implementing each of the 41 recommendations detailed in its Report. The Commission gave an "F" to the commission's recommendation regarding "Coalition Standards for Terrorist Detention.".

To explain its issuance of a failing grade with respect to the government's compliance with this recommendation, the Commission stated that:

"The U.S. has not engaged in a common coalition approach to developing standards for detention and prosecution of captured terrorists. Indeed, U.S. treatment of detainees has elicited broad criticism, and makes it harder to build the necessary alliances to cooperate effectively with partners in a global war on terror.".

=== Washington and Lee University ===
Several professors and alumni at Washington and Lee University sought to assist the process of implementing the 9/11 Commission's recommendation by initiating a scholarly dialogue between military practitioners and legal experts aimed at identifying the high end of prevailing transnational norms pertaining to detainee treatment. They created The Lexington Principles Project and began the lengthy process of research and analysis that culminated in the publication of the Draft Lexington Principles on the Rights of Detainees on September 25, 2008. These draft principles were approved and published in final form on April 1, 2009, along with student-edited annotations.

== Methodology ==
=== Codifying the Gold Standard in Transnational Detainee Treatment Standards ===
The Lexington Principles Project's participants did not want simply to restate existing international norms. Many groups had already aptly performed that function and such an effort would have been redundant, and possibly even counterproductive to developing a universal approach to detainee treatment. The Lexington Principles Project therefore aimed to develop a progressive set of principles recognizing the highest standards set forth in international law and the domestic legal systems of foreign nations.

=== Transnational Legal Process Approach ===
To overcome the difficulties inherent in applying international law in domestic courts, the Lexington Principles Project structured its efforts in accordance with the theory of Transnational Legal Process developed by Harold Hongju Koh, the Dean of Yale Law School. The Project's use of this approach was facilitated by the availability of the considerable transnational law resources of the Transnational Law Institute at Washington and Lee University School of Law.

=== Due Process Paradigm ===
The Transnational Legal Process approach required the group to focus on vertical process throughout all stages of norm definition. The result was the creation of an innovative conceptual framework based on the familiar common law due process paradigm. Accordingly, the bulk of detainee rights under international law are categorized into one of three groups:

1. General Provisions
2. Procedural Due Process
3. Substantive Due Process

=== Normative Translation ===
The term "due process" is unique to common law legal systems, and is not generally found in the text of international human rights and humanitarian law treaties. Due process is a powerful concept at common law, so it was important for the Lexington Principles to be phrased in those terms. All of the transnational norms discovered during the lengthy research phase of the Lexington Principles Project needed to be translated into aspects of due process. This was accomplished by distilling all points of mutuality in the law governing detainee treatment under both international law and domestic U.S. law down to one central right: the right to physical liberty. Principle 1 of the Lexington Principles on the Rights of Detainees codified this right, and all other rights were drafted as essentially derivative of this central guarantee.

Principle 1 states, "Physical liberty is a fundamental human right and may not be denied to any person without due process of law.".

=== Transnational Incorporation Doctrine ===
The Transnational Incorporation Doctrine, first developed for the Lexington Principles, asserts that there are some principles of international law that are so fundamental to accepted global standards of justice that they should be implied as part the right to due process of law under the Fifth Amendment to the U.S. Constitution. This is a new progressive theory that has yet to be adopted by the United States Supreme Court. The theory was constructed by the professors drafting the Lexington Principles as a means of offering modern judges a jurisprudential concept that could afford them the opportunity to recognize a host of modern human rights that have developed in legal systems around the world since the American Bill of Rights was ratified in 1791. This conceptual mechanism for transnational norm internalization, if adopted by the U.S. Supreme Court, would give progressive American judges the opportunity to protect individual liberty by incorporating into the Fifth Amendment's Due Process Clause a variety of new and emerging human rights protections that pertain to modern American life in the Information Age. Liberty rights associated with privacy and personal autonomy in cyberspace were inconceivable in 1791 during the drafting of the original Bill of Rights. The Transnational Incorporation Doctrine would provide a way for courts to modernize the rights all American citizens enjoy vis-a-vis their government without the need to amend the Constitution through the cumbersome process prescribed in Article V. The formal amendment process makes meaningful change practically impossible to achieve, which is why the Lexington Principles Project crafted this new mechanism to facilitate bringing Americans rights up to the highest transnational standards.

=== Moving Beyond Nationality and Territoriality ===
A significant ancillary consequence of the novel and still unadopted Transnational Incorporation Doctrine would be its effect on the rights afforded to non-United States persons under U.S. law. Presently, United States citizens and permanent residents are afforded full protection under the United States Constitution both at home and abroad, with limited exceptions. Persons who are not American citizens or permanent residents are afforded no protection under the U.S. Constitution outside of U.S. borders and substantially diminished rights while on U.S. soil. The Transnational Incorporation Doctrine, if adopted, would change the American understanding of Constitutional rights making them "human" rights rather than rights tied to nationality or territorial location.

Support for this result comes from the emerging transnational trend toward universality of international human rights law. Because international human rights are universal, the Transnational Incorporation Doctrine's new interpretation of the Fifth Amendment's Due Process Clause could result in universal application of all incorporated rights regardless of nationality or physical location. With respect to these newly domesticated transnational rights, former barriers to rights recognition based on nationality and territoriality would no longer affect applicability. Any rights incorporated through the Transnational Incorporation Doctrine would likely have to be universally afforded to all human beings by the U.S. government.

These new transnational rights likely would not be nearly as extensive as those offered to U.S. citizens in the United States, but at a minimum they would ensure that the most fundamental due process rights are always afforded in all instances where a human being is detained by the U.S. government for any reason anywhere in the world.

== The Lexington Principles on the Rights of Detainees (April 1, 2009) ==
=== I. Part I: General Provisions ===
==== A. Section A: Fundamental Right to Physical Liberty and Due Process of Law ====
===== 1. Principle 1: Right to Physical Liberty and Due Process of Law =====
Physical liberty is a fundamental human right and may not be denied to any person without due process of law.

==== B. Section B: Scope of Application ====
===== 2. Principle 2: General Statement of Universal Applicability =====
The fundamental protections inherent in the right to due process of law are universal and apply in all situations where a person has been detained by a State or its agents regardless of the reasons for, or circumstances surrounding, the detention.

===== 3. Principle 3: Irrelevance of Geography =====
The fundamental protections inherent in the right to due process of law are universal and should be afforded to all persons detained by a State or its agents without regard to the location of capture or detention.

===== 4. Principle 4: Nondiscrimination =====
The fundamental protections inherent in the right to due process of law are universal and should be afforded to all persons detained by a State or its agents without regard to nationality, national origin, ethnic origin, race, color, descent, language, religion, faith, sex, age, birth, parentage, wealth, or any other such criteria.

==== C. Section C: State Responsibility ====
===== 5. Principle 5: General Statement of State Responsibility to Protect =====
Each State has the responsibility to protect the right to physical liberty for all persons within its territory or otherwise under its control except insofar as they are properly detained in accordance with Principle 1.

===== 6. Principle 6: Commencement of State Responsibility to Protect =====
At a minimum, a State's responsibility to protect the due process rights of a person begins at the moment the person is detained by its agents.

===== 7. Principle 7: Duration of State Responsibility to Protect =====
Once initiated, a State's responsibility to protect the due process rights of a person continues until that individuals physical liberty is ultimately restored.

===== 8. Principle 8: State Responsibility to Protect upon Transfer =====
Transfer of a Person to the custody of another State does not terminate the transferring States responsibility to protect the rights of the transferee. The transferring State should maintain an active interest in the rights of the transferee and seek periodic assurances that due process rights are continuously afforded until the transferees physical liberty is ultimately restored.

==== D. Section D: International Obligation ====
===== 9. Principle 9: Statement of Universal Concern =====
A State's compliance with its responsibility to protect the fundamental rights of persons it deprives of physical liberty is a concern of humankind and therefore should be of interest to all members of the international community.

==== E. Section E: Relationship to Other Laws ====
===== 10. Principle 10: Rules of Construction =====
These Principles should not be construed to diminish any human right or protection afforded by any other source of law.

=== II. Part II: Procedural Due Process ===
==== A. Section A: General Statement of Procedural Rights ====
===== 11. Principle 11: Right to Procedural Due Process =====
Procedural due process is a human right requiring that all persons be afforded notice of, and an opportunity to challenge, any State action substantially affecting their fundamental right to physical liberty in a fair and public hearing before an impartial adjudicator with the independent authority to remedy violations through direct action and without undue restrictions.

===== 12. Principle 12: Prohibition of Extralegal Arrest and Detention =====
Due process requires that no deprivation of liberty occur outside of a legal process designed and equipped to assess the legality of the deprivation before, after, and during the period of detention.

===== 13. Principle 13: Prohibition of Extralegal Rendition =====
No State should subject any person to nonconsensual transfer from one national jurisdiction to another unless such transfer is performed pursuant to judicial process.

==== B. Section B: Notice ====
===== 14. Principle 14: Notice of Reasons for Deprivation and Procedural Rights =====
When a State substantially impairs the right to physical liberty of any person it should provide that person with effective written notice of the reasons for the impairment and the procedural mechanisms through which the person may challenge the deprivation.

===== 15. Principle 15: Sufficiency of Notice =====
The required notice should be sufficient to inform the person of the laws authorizing the impairment and the nature of the evidence justifying its use in the specific case, described with sufficient particularity to allow the person to evaluate the factual and legal basis for the deprivation. If full disclosure of the evidence underlying the factual basis for the detention would result in a substantial risk of harm to individuals or national security, the detainee may be informed of the general nature of the States justification for the detention sufficient to allow the detainee to communicate relevant information to the detaining authorities which might assist them in determining whether continued detention is justified.

==== C. Section C: Opportunity to be Heard ====
===== 16. Principle 16: Right to Challenge Substantial Deprivations =====
All persons should have the right to challenge any substantial State deprivations of their right to physical liberty before a fair and impartial decision maker with the authority to remedy undue infringements without unnecessary delay.

===== 17. Principle 17: Right to Presumption of Innocence in Criminal Hearings =====
All persons charged with a criminal offense should be presumed innocent until proven guilty through an adjudicative process conducted in accordance with the requirements of due process.

===== 18. Principle 18: Right to Participate in Legal Process =====
All persons should be afforded the opportunity to participate in legal proceedings adjudicating matters directly affecting their right to physical liberty.

===== 19. Principle 19: Right to Counsel =====
All persons should be afforded the opportunity to consult legal counsel before and during legal proceedings adjudicating matters pertaining to substantial deprivations of their right to physical liberty.

==== D. Section D: Fair and Impartial Decision Maker ====
===== 20. Principle 20: Composition of Adjudicative Mechanism =====
Decision makers charged with adjudicating matters affecting a person's fundamental rights should be impartial and adequately educated to properly perform that function.

===== 21. Principle 21: Right of Adjudicators to Report Suspected Abuses =====
Adjudicators should have the means to report their concerns regarding suspected rights violations to appropriate authorities outside of the control of the governmental entity suspected of committing the violations.

=== III. Part III: Substantive Due Process ===
==== A. Section A: General Statement of Substantive Rights ====
===== 22. Principle 22: Right to Substantive Due Process =====
Implicit in the fundamental right to due process of law is the requirement that no State should deprive any person of life, liberty, or security of person in violation of any right fundamental to accepted principles of global justice.

==== B. Section B: Prohibition of Arbitrary Deprivations of Physical Liberty ====
===== 23. Principle 23: Prohibition of Arbitrary Arrest and Detention =====
No State should arrest or detain any person for reasons that are arbitrary. An arrest or detention is arbitrary if it is not performed pursuant to law or if it is incompatible with the fundamental principles of global justice.

===== 24. Principle 24: Right to the Rule of Law =====
No person should be deprived of the right to physical liberty except pursuant to the rule of law. State actors should never deprive any person of physical liberty except pursuant to specific and demonstrable legal authority governed by written laws and procedures.

===== 25. Principle 25: Prohibition of Detention Based on the Exercise of Fundamental Rights =====
No State should detain any person based solely on that persons exercise of a fundamental human right.

===== 26. Principle 26: Prohibition of Detention Based on Discriminatory Animus =====
No State should detain any person based solely on that persons nationality, national origin, ethnic origin, race, color, descent, language, religion, faith, sex, age, birth, parentage, wealth, or any similar criteria.

===== 27. Principle 27: Prohibition of Ex Post Facto Application of Penal Law =====
No State should try any person for a penal offense based on acts or omissions which did not constitute a penal offense at the time they were committed.

===== 28. Principle 28: Prohibition of Double Jeopardy =====
No State should detain, try, or punish any person for an offence for which the person has already been finally convicted or acquitted.

===== 29. Principle 29: Prohibition of Deprivations Based on the Actions of Third Parties =====
No State should deprive any person of liberty based solely on the alleged or actual wrongdoing of a third party.

===== 30. Principle 30: Prohibition of Indefinite Non-Punitive Detention =====
Extrajudicial detention beyond the time necessary to serve a compelling and current state objective is inconsistent with the principles of due process. No State should detain any person outside the judicial process unless such detention is conducted in accordance with substantial procedural safeguards narrowly tailored to ensure the detention is strictly limited to the time necessary to serve a compelling and current state objective.

===== 31. Principle 31: Right to Repatriation Following Detention =====
All persons should be afforded the right to return to their country of nationality or citizenship upon the cessation of detention by a foreign State.

==== C. Section C: Prohibition of Incommunicado Detention ====
===== 32. Principle 32: Prohibition of Incommunicado Detention =====
Prolonged incommunicado detention is incompatible with the substantive liberty guarantees inherent in the fundamental right to due process of law.

===== 33. Principle 33: Right to Communicate with Relatives =====
Persons subjected to prolonged detention should be allowed to communicate with their family at regular intervals, subject to the supervision of the detaining authorities, unless the State demonstrates that the denial of such communication is necessary based on a demonstrable risk to national security or the safety of any person.

===== 34. Principle 34: Right to Communicate with Diplomatic or Consular Representatives =====
All persons deprived of their liberty by the government of a foreign State should be allowed reasonable opportunities to communicate with the diplomatic or consular representatives of their home State as soon as practicable after the deprivation and periodically throughout the period of detention as needed to ensure they are afforded the full benefits of the protections guaranteed to foreign nationals under international law.

All persons who are refugees, stateless persons, or nationals of States without diplomatic or consular representation in the detaining State should be allowed reasonable opportunities to communicate with the diplomatic and consular representatives of the State which takes charge of their interests or any national or international authority whose task it is to protect such persons.

===== 35. Principle 35: Right to Unmonitored Communication with Physicians =====
All persons subjected to prolonged deprivations of liberty should be afforded the right to periodic unmonitored communications with the physicians charged with providing their medical care in order to allow the disclosure of allegations of abuse by the detaining authorities.

===== 36. Principle 36: Right of Physicians to Report Suspected Rights Violations =====
Physicians charged with providing medical care for persons deprived of their liberty should be afforded a mechanism for disclosure of suspected detainee abuse to an authority outside the control of the entity committing the abuse, under conditions affording the physician adequate protection against retribution.

===== 37. Principle 37: Right to Information about the Outside World =====
All persons deprived of their liberty for an extended time should be given regular access to periodicals, books, educational materials, audio programs, writing materials, and other such items intended to keep them mentally engaged, informed of world events, and to allow them to make productive use of their time while in detention.

===== 38. Principle 38: Right of Public Access to Facility Procedures =====
A detaining State should make the general procedures governing the operation of its detention facilities available to the public. Sensitive security information may be exempted from public disclosure, although such procedures should be subject to review through an independent mechanism within the detaining government.

===== 39. Principle 39: Rights of Relief Organizations to Inspect Prisoners and Facilities =====
No State should unduly restrict the ability of the International Committee of the Red Cross and other appropriate relief organizations to inspect detention facilities and to engage in unmonitored communication with individual detainees for the purpose of monitoring the States compliance with its responsibility to protect the fundamental rights of detainees under its control.

==== D. Section D: Prohibition of Offenses to Personal Welfare and Human Dignity ====
===== 40. Principle 40: Prohibition of Grave Breaches =====
No State should subject any person to torture, cruel treatment, biological experiments, murder, mutilation, maiming, rape, sexual abuse, or the intentional infliction of serious bodily or psychological injury.

===== 41. Principle 41: Prohibition of Extra-Legal Interrogation Methods =====
No State should interrogate any person employing methods that have not been approved for use by law.

===== 42. Principle 42: Duty to Maintain Records of Physical Interrogations =====
A State employing physical interrogation methods on any person should be required to maintain records detailing the specific dates, times, and duration of each physical interrogation session and specifying all of the physical methods employed together with the written legal authorization approving their use. Such records should be maintained for a period of fifty years, and destruction of such records should be a criminal offense.

===== 43. Principle 43: Right of Access to Records of Physical Interrogations =====
All persons subjected to physical interrogation methods by a State should be given full access to the records pertaining to such interrogations.

===== 44. Principle 44: Right to Adequate Healthcare, Nutrition, and Exercise =====
All persons deprived of their liberty should be afforded adequate healthcare, nutrition, and opportunities for physical exercise necessary for the maintenance of both physical and mental fitness during the period of detention.

===== 45. Principle 45: Right to Religious Observance =====
All persons deprived of their liberty should be afforded reasonable accommodations necessary to permit religious observance in accordance with the tenets of their faith or dictates of their conscience.

== See also ==
=== U.S. Intelligence Law ===
- Interrogation

=== The 9/11 Commission ===
- 9/11 Commission
- 9/11 Commission Report

=== Due Process ===
- Detainee
- Due process
- Incorporation (Bill of Rights)
- Prisoner abuse

=== Human Rights ===
- History of human rights
- Human rights

=== International Human Rights Law ===
- Universal Declaration of Human Rights, 1948
- European Convention on Human Rights, 1950
- Convention on the Elimination of All Forms of Racial Discrimination, 1969
- International Covenant on Civil and Political Rights, 1976
- United Nations Convention Against Torture, 1987
- Convention on the Elimination of All Forms of Discrimination Against Women, 1981
- Convention on the Rights of the Child, 1990
- Charter of Fundamental Rights of the European Union, 2000

=== International Humanitarian Law ===
- Hague Conventions
- Geneva Conventions
  - First Geneva Convention "for the Amelioration of the Condition of the Wounded and Sick in Armed Forces in the Field" (first adopted in 1864, last revision in 1949)
  - Second Geneva Convention "for the Amelioration of the Condition of Wounded, Sick and Shipwrecked Members of Armed Forces at Sea" (first adopted in 1949, successor of the 1907 Hague Convention X)
  - Third Geneva Convention "relative to the Treatment of Prisoners of War" (first adopted in 1929, last revision in 1949)
  - Fourth Geneva Convention "relative to the Protection of Civilian Persons in Time of War" (first adopted in 1949, based on parts of the 1907 Hague Convention IV)
  - Protocol I (1977): Protocol Additional to the Geneva Conventions of August 12, 1949, and relating to the Protection of Victims of International Armed Conflicts. As of January 12, 2007, it had been ratified by 167 countries.
  - Protocol II (1977): Protocol Additional to the Geneva Conventions of August 12, 1949, and relating to the Protection of Victims of Non-International Armed Conflicts. As of January 12, 2007, it had been ratified by 163 countries.
  - Protocol III (2005): Protocol Additional to the Geneva Conventions of August 12, 1949, and relating to the Adoption of an Additional Distinctive Emblem. As of June 2007 it had been ratified by 17 countries and signed but not yet ratified by an additional 68 countries.

=== Codifications of International Norms ===
- Standard Minimum Rules for the Treatment of Prisoners, 1977

=== National Human Rights Law ===
- Cáin Adomnáin, 697
- Magna Carta, England, 1215
- Golden Bull, Hungary, 1222
- English Bill of Rights and Scottish Claim of Right, 1689
- Virginia Declaration of Rights, June 1776
- United States Bill of Rights, completed in 1789, approved in 1791
- Declaration of the Rights of Man and of the Citizen, France 1789
- Constitution of the Soviet Union, first 1918, but did not guarantee rights to the middle class
- Canadian Charter of Rights and Freedoms, 1982
