= Rule of Law in Armed Conflicts Project =

International law initiative

The Rule of Law in Armed Conflicts Project (RULAC Project) is an initiative of the Geneva Academy of International Humanitarian Law and Human Rights to support the application and implementation of the international law of armed conflict.

== Overview ==
Through a global database and analysis, the RULAC Project has as its aim an assessment of the implementation by states of the law applicable in armed conflicts:

- international humanitarian law
- international human rights law
- international criminal law
- refugee law

The project will ultimately cover all member states of the United Nations and parties to the Geneva Conventions as well as contested territories, whether they are in situation of armed conflict or not. Indeed, certain international rules must be implemented during peacetime or are relevant in post-conflict situations, in particular those relating to the repression of international crimes. In addition, the rules regarding the fight against terrorism, also to be covered by the website, are applicable to states that are not necessarily in a situation of armed conflict.

The website is divided into three parts. The homepage offers a small description of the applicable law and addresses the main legal issues in that area, for example the legal qualification of conflicts or the applicability of international law to non-state armed groups. The website then offers for each country the relevant texts and documents dealing with the national and international legal framework (national legislation and case law, resolutions of intergovernmental organizations, treaty, etc.). Finally, the website offers a legal analysis that, on one hand, qualifies the conflict under international humanitarian law and on the other hand, determines the applicable law. This part of the website, certainly the most delicate in juridical and political terms, is particular to the RULAC Project.

The RULAC Project is expected to be a precious source of information for government officials, journalists and more widely for any person interested in the respect of the law in war.

== Geneva Conventions ==
The first three Geneva Conventions were revised, expanded, and replaced, and the fourth one was added, in 1949.

- The Geneva Convention for the Amelioration of the Condition of the Wounded and Sick in Armed Forces in the Field was adopted in 1864. It was significantly revised and replaced by the 1906 version, the 1929 version, and later the First Geneva Convention of 1949.
- The Geneva Convention for the Amelioration of the Condition of Wounded, Sick and Shipwrecked Members of Armed Forces at Sea was adopted in 1906. It was significantly revised and replaced by the Second Geneva Convention of 1949.
- The Geneva Convention relative to the Treatment of Prisoners of War was adopted in 1929. It was significantly revised and replaced by the Third Geneva Convention of 1949.
- The Fourth Geneva Convention relative to the Protection of Civilian Persons in Time of War was adopted in 1949.

In addition, there are three additional amendment protocols to the Geneva Convention:

- Protocol I (1977): Protocol Additional to the Geneva Conventions of 12 August 1949, and relating to the Protection of Victims of International Armed Conflicts. As of 12 January 2007 it had been ratified by 167 countries.
- Protocol II (1977): Protocol Additional to the Geneva Conventions of 12 August 1949, and relating to the Protection of Victims of Non-International Armed Conflicts. As of 12 January 2007 it had been ratified by 163 countries.
- Protocol III (2005): Protocol Additional to the Geneva Conventions of 12 August 1949, and relating to the Adoption of an Additional Distinctive Emblem. As of June 2007 it had been ratified by 17 countries and signed but not yet ratified by an additional 68 countries.

ICRC, What is International Humanitarian Law?, Fact Sheet, 2004.

ICRC, Basic Rules of the 1949 Geneva Conventions and 1977 Additional Protocols, 1988

ICRC, study of customary international humanitarian law.

== See also ==
- Combatant
- Crime against humanity
- Customary international law
- Disarmed Enemy Forces
- Genocide
- Human rights
- International human rights instruments
- Just War
- Prisoner-of-war camp
- Prisoner of war
- Protective sign
- Roerich’s Pact
- Rule of law
- Rule According to Higher Law
- Total war
- War crime
