= List of parties to the Geneva Conventions =

Parties to GC I–IV and P I–III / Parties to GC I–IV and P I–II; Parties to GC I–IV and P I and III / Parties to GC I–IV and P I; Parties to GC I–IV and P III / Parties to GC I–IV and no P

The Geneva Conventions, which were most recently revised in 1949, consist of seven individual treaties which are open to ratification or accession by any sovereign state. They are:

- The Geneva Conventions
  - First Geneva Convention
  - Second Geneva Convention
  - Third Geneva Convention
  - Fourth Geneva Convention
- Additional Protocols
  - Protocol I
  - Protocol II
  - Protocol III

The four 1949 Conventions have been ratified by 196 states, including all UN member states, both UN observers (the Holy See and the State of Palestine), as well as the Cook Islands. The Protocols have been ratified by 175, 170 and 80 states respectively. In addition, Article 90 of Protocol I states that "The High Contracting Parties may at the time of signing, ratifying or acceding to the Protocol, or at any other subsequent time, declare that they recognize ipso facto and without special agreement, in relation to any other High Contracting Party accepting the same obligation, the competence of the [International Fact-Finding] Commission to enquire into allegations by such other Party, as authorized by this Article." 77 states have made such a declaration.

== Parties to the 1949 Conventions and Protocols I–III ==
List of state parties to the Geneva Conventions
State	Year of ratification/accession/succession (Note: "S" indicates that the state has signed but has not ratified. "—" indicates that the state has taken no action.)					Notes
State	GC I–IV	Protocol I	Protocol II	Protocol III	Prot. I Art. 90 Declaration	Notes
Afghanistan	1956	2009	2009	—	—	
Albania	1957	1993	1993	2008	—	
Algeria	1960	1989	1989	—	1989	
Andorra	1993	2025	2025	2025	2025	
Angola	1984	1984	2019	S	—	
Antigua and Barbuda	1986	1986	1986	—	—	
Argentina	1956	1986	1986	2011	1996	
Armenia	1993	1993	1993	2011	—	
Australia	1958	1991	1991	2009	1992	
Austria	1953	1982	1982	2009	1982	
Azerbaijan	1993	—	—	—	—	
Bahamas	1975	1980	1980	—	—	
Bahrain	1971	1986	1986	—	—	
Bangladesh	1972	1980	1980	—	—	
Barbados	1968	1990	1990	—	—	
Belarus	1954	1989	1989	2011	1989	Conventions I–IV and Protocols I–II ratified as the Byelorussian SSR.
Belgium	1952	1986	1986	2015	1987	
Belize	1984	1984	1984	2007	—	
Benin	1961	1986	1986	—	—	
Bhutan	1991	—	—	—	—	
Bolivia	1976	1992	1983	S	1992	
Bosnia and Herzegovina	1992	1992	1992	S	1992	
Botswana	1968	1979	1979	—	—	
Brazil	1957	1992	1992	2009	1993	
Brunei	1991	1991	1991	—	—	
Bulgaria	1954	1989	1989	2006	1994	
Burkina Faso	1961	1987	1987	2016	2004	
Burundi	1971	1993	1993	S	—	
Cambodia	1958	1998	1998	—	—	
Cameroon	1963	1984	1984	2021	—	
Canada	1965	1990	1990	2007	1990	
Cape Verde	1984	1995	1995	S	1995	
Central African Republic	1966	1984	1984	—	—	
Chad	1970	1997	1997	—	—	
Chile	1950	1991	1991	2008	1991	
China	1956	1983	1983	—	—	Conventions I–IV ratified as the Republic of China which was a signatory in 1956. Macau was declared by China to be covered by its ratification of Conventions I–IV and Protocols I–II from 20 December 1999, the same date Portugal renounced their obligations for the territory following the transfer of sovereignty over Macau to China. Hong Kong was declared by China to be covered by its ratification of Conventions I–IV and Protocols I–II from 1 July 1997, the same date the UK renounced their obligations for the territory following the transfer of sovereignty over Hong Kong to China.
Colombia	1961	1993	1995	S	1996	
Comoros	1985	1985	1985	—	—	
Democratic Republic of the Congo	1961	1982	2002	—	2002	
Republic of the Congo	1967	1983	1983	S	—	
Cook Islands	2002	2002	2002	2011	2002	
Costa Rica	1969	1983	1983	2008	1999	
Côte d'Ivoire	1961	1989	1989	—	—	
Croatia	1992	1992	1992	2007	1992	
Cuba	1954	1982	1999	—	—	
Cyprus	1962	1979	1996	2007	2002	
Czech Republic	1993	1993	1993	2007	1995	
Denmark	1951	1982	1982	2007	1982	All the treaties extended to the Faroe Islands and to Greenland. (Note: Denmark informed the Secretary-General of the United Nations in 2003 that "Denmark's ratifications normally include the entire Kingdom of Denmark including the Faroe Islands and Greenland.” No declaration excluding either of their dependent territories was made by Denmark upon ratification of any of the seven treaties.)
Djibouti	1978	1991	1991	—	—	
Dominica	1981	1996	1996	—	—	
Dominican Republic	1958	1994	1994	2009	—	
Ecuador	1954	1979	1979	2020	—	
Egypt	1952	1992	1992	—	—	
El Salvador	1953	1978	1978	2007	—	
Equatorial Guinea	1986	1986	1986	—	—	
Eritrea	2000	—	—	—	—	
Estonia	1993	1993	1993	2008	2009	
Ethiopia	1969	1994	1994	S	—	
Fiji	1971	2008	2008	2008	—	
Finland	1955	1980	1980	2009	1980	
France	1951	2001	1984	2009	—	
Gabon	1965	1980	1980	—	—	
The Gambia	1966	1989	1989	—	—	
Georgia	1993	1993	1993	2007	—	
Germany	1954	1991	1991	2009	1991	
Ghana	1958	1978	1978	S	—	
Greece	1956	1989	1993	2009	1998	
Grenada	1981	1998	1998	—	—	
Guatemala	1952	1987	1987	2008	—	
Guinea	1984	1984	1984	—	1993	
Guinea-Bissau	1974	1986	1986	—	—	
Guyana	1968	1998	1998	2009	—	
Haiti	1957	2006	2006	S	—	
Holy See	1951	1985	1985	—	—	
Honduras	1965	1995	1995	2006	2025	
Hungary	1954	1989	1989	2006	1991	
Iceland	1965	1987	1987	2006	1987	
India	1950	—	—	—	—	
Indonesia	1958	—	—	—	—	
Iran	1957	S	S	—	—	
Iraq	1956	2010	—	—	—	
Ireland	1962	1999	1999	S	1999	
Israel	1951	—	—	2007	—	
Italy	1951	1986	1986	2009	1986	
Jamaica	1964	1986	1986	S	—	
Japan	1953	2004	2004	—	2004	
Jordan	1951	1979	1979	—	—	
Kazakhstan	1992	1992	1992	2009	—	
Kenya	1966	1999	1999	2013	—	
Kiribati	1989	—	—	—	—	
North Korea	1957	1988	—	—	—	
South Korea	1966	1982	1982	S	2004	
Kuwait	1967	1985	1985	—	2013	
Kyrgyzstan	1992	1992	1992	2019	—	
Laos	1956	1980	1980	—	1998	
Latvia	1991	1991	1991	2007	—	
Lebanon	1951	1997	1997	—	—	
Lesotho	1968	1994	1994	2020	2010	
Liberia	1954	1988	1988	—	—	
Libya	1956	1978	1978	—	—	
Liechtenstein	1950	1989	1989	2006	1989	
Lithuania	1996	2000	2000	2007	2000	
Luxembourg	1953	1989	1989	2015	1993	
North Macedonia	1993	1993	1993	2008	1993	
Madagascar	1963	1992	1992	2018	1993	
Malawi	1968	1991	1991	—	2014	
Malaysia	1962	—	—	—	—	
Maldives	1991	1991	1991	—	—	
Mali	1965	1989	1989	—	2003	
Malta	1968	1989	1989	S	1989	
Marshall Islands	2004	—	—	—	—	
Mauritania	1962	1980	1980	—	—	
Mauritius	1970	1982	1982	—	—	
Mexico	1952	1983	—	2008	—	
Federated States of Micronesia	1995	1995	1995	—	—	
Moldova	1993	1993	1993	2008	—	
Monaco	1950	2000	2000	2007	2007	
Mongolia	1958	1995	1995	—	1995	
Montenegro	2006	2006	2006	—	2007	
Morocco	1956	2011	2011	—	—	
Mozambique	1983	1983	2002	—	—	
Myanmar	1992	—	—	—	—	
Namibia	1991	1994	1994	—	1994	The United Nations Council for Namibia acceded to Conventions I–IV and Protocols I–II in 1983. Namibia succeeded to Conventions I-IV in 1991, and Protocols I-II in 1994.
Nauru	2006	2006	2006	2012	—	
Nepal	1964	—	—	S	—	
Netherlands	1954	1987	1987	2006	1987	Conventions I–IV and Protocols I–III have been extended to Aruba, Curaçao, Sint Maarten, and the Caribbean Netherlands. (Note: The Conventions I–IV and Protocols I–III were originally extended to the Netherlands Antilles prior to its dissolution into Aruba in 1986, and Curaçao, Sint Maarten, and the Caribbean Netherlands in 2010.)
New Zealand	1959	1988	1988	2013	1988	Niue is considered bound by New Zealand's ratification of Conventions I–IV in 1959 by the International Committee of the Red Cross on the basis of Niue's enactment of its own Geneva Conventions Act 1958. New Zealand declared that its ratification of Protocols I–II does not extend to the Cook Islands (which subsequently independently ratified the Protocols), Niue and Tokelau.
Nicaragua	1953	1999	1999	2009	—	
Niger	1964	1979	1979	—	—	
Nigeria	1961	1988	1988	—	—	
Norway	1951	1981	1981	2006	1981	
Oman	1974	1984	1984	—	—	
Pakistan	1951	S	S	—	—	
Palau	1996	1996	1996	—	—	
Palestine	2014	2014	2015	2015	2018	The Palestine Liberation Organization (PLO) unilaterally declared itself bound by Conventions I–IV and Protocol I in 1982. In 1989, the PLO submitted a letter to the Swiss Federal Department of Foreign Affairs which stated in part that the State of Palestine had decided to "adhere to the Four Geneva Conventions of 12 August 1949 and the two Protocols additional thereto." However, the Swiss Government, which acts as the depositary for the Conventions, responded by stating that it was "not in a position to decide whether this communication can be considered as an instrument of accession" due to "the incertainty [sic] within the international community as to the existence or non-existence of a State of Palestine." In 1990, the PLO submitted a "Memorandum on the accession of the State of Palestine to the four Geneva Conventions of 12 August 1949" to the depository and requested that the issue be reconsidered. However, the Swiss Government reiterated its prior conclusions. Following the United Nations General Assembly passing a resolution granting non-member observer state status to Palestine in November 2012, Palestine acceded to Conventions I-IV and Protocol I in April 2014. In January 2015 Palestine acceded to Protocols II and III.
Panama	1956	1995	1995	2012	1999	
Papua New Guinea	1976	—	—	—	—	
Paraguay	1961	1990	1990	2008	1998	
Peru	1956	1989	1989	2018	—	
Philippines	1951 (I); 1952 (II–IV)	2012	1986	2006	—	
Poland	1954	1991	1991	2009	1992	
Portugal	1961	1992	1992	2014	1994	
Qatar	1975	1988	2005	—	1991	
Romania	1954	1990	1990	2015	1995	
Russia	1954	1989	1989	S	~~1989~~	Conventions I–IV and Protocols I and II ratified as the Soviet Union. Declaration under Article 90 of Protocol 1 withdrawn in 2019.
Rwanda	1964	1984	1984	—	1993	
Saint Kitts and Nevis	1986	1986	1986	—	2014	
Saint Lucia	1981	1982	1982	—	—	
Saint Vincent and the Grenadines	1981	1983	1983	—	2013	
Samoa	1984	1984	1984	—	—	
San Marino	1953	1994	1994	2007	—	
Sao Tome and Principe	1976	1996	1996	—	—	
Saudi Arabia	1963	1987	2001	—	—	
Senegal	1963	1985	1985	—	—	
Serbia	2001	2001	2001	2010	2001	Conventions I–IV and Protocols I–II ratified as the Federal Republic of Yugoslavia.
Seychelles	1984	1984	1984	—	1992	
Sierra Leone	1965	1986	1986	S	—	
Singapore	1973	—	—	2008	—	
Slovakia	1993	1993	1993	2007	1995	
Slovenia	1992	1992	1992	2008	1992	
Solomon Islands	1981	1988	1988	—	—	
Somalia	1962	—	—	—	—	
South Africa	1952	1995	1995	—	—	
South Sudan	2013	2013	2013	2013	—	
Spain	1952	1989	1989	2010	1989	
Sri Lanka	1959	—	—	—	—	
Sudan	1957	2006	2006	—	—	
Suriname	1976	1985	1985	2013	—	
Eswatini	1973	1995	1995	—	—	
Sweden	1953	1979	1979	2014	1979	
Switzerland	1950	1982	1982	2006	1982	
Syria	1953	1983	—	—	—	
Tajikistan	1993	1993	1993	—	1997	
Tanzania	1962	1983	1983	S	—	Conventions I–IV ratified as Tanganyika.
Thailand	1954	—	—	—	—	
Timor-Leste	2003	2005	2005	2011	—	
Togo	1962	1984	1984	S	1991	
Tonga	1978	2003	2003	—	2003	
Trinidad and Tobago	1963	2001	2001	—	2001	
Tunisia	1957	1979	1979	—	—	
Turkey	1954	—	—	S	—	
Turkmenistan	1992	1992	1992	—	—	
Tuvalu	1981	—	—	—	—	
Uganda	1964	1991	1991	2008	—	
Ukraine	1954	1990	1990	2010	1990	Conventions I–IV and Protocols I–II ratified as the Ukrainian SSR.
United Arab Emirates	1972	1983	1983	—	1992	
United Kingdom	1957	1998	1998	2009	1999	Protocols I–III have been extended to all three Crown dependencies and to 13 of the 14 British Overseas Territories (excluding Gibraltar).
United States	1955	S	S	2007	—	Signed in 1949. Ratified June 9, 1955. Protocols I–II not ratified
Uruguay	1969	1985	1985	2012	1990	
Uzbekistan	1993	1993	1993	—	—	
Vanuatu	1982	1985	1985	—	—	
Venezuela	1956	1998	1998	—	—	
Vietnam	1957	1981	—	—	—	Conventions I–IV ratified as the North Vietnam. Also ratified by the State of Vietnam in 1953 and the Provisional Revolutionary Government of the Republic of South Vietnam in 1973 prior to Vietnamese reunification.
Yemen	1970	1990	1990	—	—	Conventions I–IV and Protocols I–II ratified as North Yemen. Conventions I–IV also ratified by South Yemen in 1977 prior to Yemeni unification.
Zambia	1966	1995	1995	—	—	
Zimbabwe	1983	1992	1992	—	—	
Totals						
Ratified	196	175	170	80	78	
Signed only	0	3	3	20	N/A	

Authorities who deposited a unilateral declaration pursuant to Article 96, paragraph 3, of Protocol I
Authority	Year of declaration	Conflict	Notes
(Sahrawi Arab Democratic Republic) Polisario Front	2015	Western Sahara conflict with Morocco	Article 96.3 of Protocol I allows for an "authority representing a people engaged against a High Contracting Party in" a war of national liberation to make a unilateral declaration to apply the four Conventions and Protocol I with respect to that conflict. As a result of such a declaration, "the Conventions and this Protocol are equally binding upon all Parties to the conflict." This provision was invoked by the Polisario Front in 2015, and as of that date was the only national liberation movement to have had their declaration accepted by the international community, since in prior attempts the relevant state was not a party to Additional Protocol I (Morocco ratified the protocol in 2011).

=== Former states parties ===
The following states were party to the Geneva Conventions I–IV, but their ratifications have not been recognised as applying to any succeeding state under international law, though all have ratified in their own right:

- Czechoslovakia
- East Germany
- South Vietnam
- South Yemen
- Yugoslavia
- Zanzibar

== Parties to the 1864 Geneva Convention ==
The first ten articles of the First Geneva Convention were concluded in 1864. This was the original Geneva Convention. The following states were parties to the 1864 Geneva Convention.

State	GC 1864 (Note: Year the state ratified or acceded to the 1864 version of the First Geneva Convention.)	Notes
Argentina	1879	
Austria	1866	
Baden	1864	Original signatory.
Bavaria	1866	Represented by Joseph Théodore Dompierre in the negotiations
Belgium	1864	Original signatory.
Bolivia	1879	
Brazil	1906	
Bulgaria	1884	
British Cape Colony	1896	The Union of South Africa was recognized as the successor state of this ratification.
Chile	1879	
China	1904	
Colombia	1906	
Congo Free State	1888	
Cuba	1907	
Denmark	1864	Original signatory.
Dominican Republic	1907	
Ecuador	1907	
El Salvador	1874	
France	1864	Original signatory.
Germany	1906	
Greece	1865	
Guatemala	1903	
Haiti	1907	
Hesse	1866	Original signatory.
Holy See	1868	
Honduras	1898	
Persia	1874	
Italy	1864	Original signatory.
Japan	1886	
Korea	1903	
Luxembourg	1888	
Mecklenburg-Schwerin	1895	
Mexico	1905	
Montenegro	1875	
Netherlands	1864	Original signatory.
Nicaragua	1898	
Orange Free State	1897	
Ottoman Empire	1865	
Panama	1907	
Paraguay	1907	
Peru	1880	
Portugal	1866	Original signatory.
Prussia	1865	Original signatory.
Romania	1874	
Russia	1867	
Saxony	1866	
Serbia	1876	
Spain	1864	Original signatory.
Sweden and Norway	1864	
Switzerland	1864	Original signatory.
Siam	1895	
United Kingdom	1865	
United States	1882	
Uruguay	1900	
Venezuela	1894	
Württemberg	1864	Original signatory.
