= Non-international armed conflict =

Armed conflict that is not international

A non-international armed conflict (NIAC) or "armed conflict not of an international character" involves one or more non-state actors, and at most one primary actor that is a state. The non-state actors can be sub-state actors, such as a region within a state. There can also be additional states, often called co-belligerents or co-parties, in limited or supporting roles. An armed conflict, in turn, is an armed confrontation of sufficiently high intensity, duration, and organization to count as such. While civil wars, often referred to as internal armed conflicts, are classified as NIACs, many non-international armed conflicts are not civil wars in a strict sense of the term (for example, when the territories of more than one state are involved in fighting).

== Classification ==
Minimum intensity. A single shot fired across a border would not count as an armed conflict; it would likely instead be called an incident or an armed confrontation. However, a week-long session of shots fired back and forth across a border would likely be considered an armed conflict. Other examples that would not be considered armed conflicts include "situations of internal disturbances and tensions, such as riots, isolated and sporadic acts of violence and other acts of a similar nature".

Gang violence. Gang violence is usually classified as criminal activity, rather than armed conflict, unless the degree of violence rises to a level similar to what is experienced in wars.

Internal conflict. Non-international armed conflicts involving multiple groups within a single state against that state are often called rebellions or a civil wars.

Overlapping conflicts. In the presence of multiple overlapping conflicts, a NIAC can coexist in the same region and at the same time together with an international armed conflict (IAC) that involves different participants.

=== Classification of NIACs ===
In a 2011 report, the International Committee of the Red Cross (ICRC) specified seven types of NIACs.

1. Conflicts involving a state "fighting against one or more armed groups within the territory of a single state". ("Classical" Common Article 3 NIACs)
2. Conflicts involving two or more organized armed groups between themselves, but no state authority.
3. Conflicts involving a state against one or more internal armed groups that then "spills over" into one or more neighboring states.
4. Conflicts involving a state supported by multinational armed forces against one or more organized armed groups. ("Multinational NIACs")
5. Conflicts involving a state against one or more organized armed groups in its territory, with assistance from forces under the control of the UN or a regional organization (e.g., the African Union).
6. Conflicts involving a state engaged in hostilities with a non-state party operating within a neighboring host state, without the host state's consent. ("Cross-border NIACs")
7. Conflicts between a state (e.g., the United States) and a non-state actor (e.g., Al Qaeda) that take place across multiple states. These often appear in the so-called "fight against terrorism". ("Transnational NIACs")

== Applicable laws ==
International Humanitarian Law (IHL) distinguishes between international and non-international armed conflicts. Though the terminology might be confusing, parts of International Humanitarian Law apply to non-international armed conflicts.

=== Geneva Conventions ===
The Geneva Conventions focuses on IACs, but Common Article 3 of the Geneva Conventions is titled "Conflicts not of an international character".

Additional Protocol I to the Geneva Conventions, written in 1977, focuses on IACs, but Article 1(2) states that cases not covered by it are protected by "principles of international law derived from established custom, from the principles of humanity and from the dictates of public conscience.

Additional Protocol II to the Geneva Conventions, also written in 1977, extends Common Article 3.

=== Other sources of law ===
Other sources of law covering NIAC include:

- the Chemical Weapons Convention (signed 13 January 1993; effective 29 April 1997);
- the Ottawa Treaty on landmines (signed 3 December 1997; effective 1 March 1999);
- the ICC's Rome Statute (signed 17 July 1998; effective 1 July 2002).

Philippe Jacques of the ICRC has proposed that the Principle of Equality for IACs (that IHL be applied equally to all parties to a conflict, regardless of the legality of their use of force under jus ad bellum) be adapted so that it can be applied to NIAC.

== Examples ==
=== Civil wars ===
- The Boxer Rebellion (1899–1901)
- The Mexican drug war, including conflict with the Sinaloa Cartel (2006–present)
- The Revolutions of 1848
- The Russian Civil War (1917–1923)
- The Spanish Civil War (1936–1939)

=== Other NAICs ===
- The 2006 Lebanon War
- The First Barbary War (1801–1805)
- The Islamic State invasion of Iraq (2014)
- The Mahdist War (1881–1899)
- Operation Traíra (1991)

== See also ==
- Law of war, also known as international humanitarian law
- Protocol I to the Geneva Conventions
- Protocol II to the Geneva Conventions
- International armed conflict

== Sources ==
- "How is the Term "Armed Conflict" Defined in International Humanitarian Law?" (pdf). icrc.org (Opinion Paper). International Committee of the Red Cross. April 2024.
