= Fourth Geneva Convention =

One of the treaties of the Geneva Convention

Convention (IV) relative to the Protection of Civilian Persons in Time of War
- Type: Multilateral treaty
- Signed: 12 August 1949
- Location: Geneva, Switzerland
- Effective: 21 October 1950
- Parties: 196 states: Afghanistan; Albania; Algeria; Andorra; Angola; Antigua and Barbuda; Argentina; Armenia; Australia; Austria; Azerbaijan; Bahamas; Bahrain; Bangladesh; Barbados; Belarus; Belgium; Belize; Benin; Bhutan; Bolivia; Bosnia and Herzegovina; Botswana; Brazil; Brunei; Bulgaria; Burkina Faso; Burundi; Cambodia; Cameroon; Canada; Cape Verde; Central African Republic; Chad; Chile; China; Colombia; Comoros; Cook Islands; Costa Rica; Croatia; Cuba; Cyprus; Czech Republic; DR Congo; Denmark; Djibouti; Dominica; Dominican Republic; Ecuador; Egypt; El Salvador; Equatorial Guinea; Eritrea; Estonia; Eswatini; Ethiopia; Federated States of Micronesia; Fiji; Finland; France; Gabon; Georgia; Germany; Ghana; Greece; Grenada; Guatemala; Guinea-Bissau; Guinea; Guyana; Haiti; Holy See; Honduras; Hungary; Iceland; India; Indonesia; Iran; Iraq; Ireland; Israel; Italy; Ivory Coast; Jamaica; Japan; Jordan; Kazakhstan; Kenya; Kiribati; Kuwait; Kyrgyzstan; Laos; Latvia; Lebanon; Lesotho; Liberia; Libya; Liechtenstein; Lithuania; Luxembourg; Madagascar; Malawi; Malaysia; Maldives; Mali; Malta; Marshall Islands; Mauritania; Mauritius; Mexico; Moldova; Monaco; Mongolia; Montenegro; Morocco; Mozambique; Myanmar; Namibia; Nauru; Nepal; Netherlands; New Zealand; Nicaragua; Niger; Nigeria; North Korea; North Macedonia; Norway; Oman; Pakistan; Palau; Palestine; Panama; Papua New Guinea; Paraguay; Peru; Philippines; Poland; Portugal; Qatar; Congo; Romania; Russia; Rwanda; Saint Kitts and Nevis; Saint Lucia; Saint Vincent and the Grenadines; Samoa; San Marino; São Tomé and Príncipe; Saudi Arabia; Senegal; Serbia; Seychelles; Sierra Leone; Singapore; Slovakia; Slovenia; Solomon Islands; Somalia; South Africa; South Korea; South Sudan; Spain; Sri Lanka; Sudan; Suriname; Sweden; Switzerland; Syria; Tajikistan; Tanzania; Thailand; Gambia; Timor-Leste; Togo; Tonga; Trinidad and Tobago; Tunisia; Turkey; Turkmenistan; Tuvalu; Uganda; Ukraine; United Arab Emirates; United Kingdom; United States; Uruguay; Uzbekistan; Vanuatu; Venezuela; Vietnam; Yemen; Zambia; Zimbabwe
- Depositary: Swiss Federal Council

The Geneva Convention (IV) relative to the Protection of Civilian Persons in Time of War (French: Convention relative à la protection des personnes civiles en temps de guerre), more commonly referred to as the Fourth Geneva Convention or Geneva Convention IV (abbreviated as GCIV), is one of the four treaties of the 1949 Geneva Conventions. It was adopted on 12 August 1949, and came into force in October 1950. While the first three 1949 conventions dealt with combatants, Geneva Convention IV was the first to deal with humanitarian protections for civilians during war. GCIV defines humanitarian protections for civilians. As of 2010 there were 196 countries party to the 1949 Geneva Conventions, including this and the three other treaties.

Parties to Geneva Conventions and Protocols Parties to GC I–IV and P I–III Parties to GC I–IV and P I and III Parties to GC I–IV and P III Parties to GC I–IV and P I–II (Note: On 23 October 2019 Vladimir Putin revoked Russia's agreement to Protocol I.) Parties to GC I–IV and P I Parties to GC I–IV and no P

Geneva Convention IV only concerns protected civilians in occupied territory rather than the effects of hostilities, such as the strategic bombing during World War II. Among its mass amount of provisions, GCIV explicitly prohibits the transfer of the population of an occupying power into the territory it occupies.

The Additional Protocol I of 1977 to the 1949 Geneva Conventions (API) prohibits all intentional attacks on "the civilian population and civilian objects." (Note: Article 48) It also prohibits and defines "indiscriminate attacks" as "incidental loss of civilian life, injury to civilians, damage to civilian objects, or a combination thereof, which would be excessive in relation to the concrete and direct military advantage anticipated." (Note: Article 51) This rule is referred to by scholars as the principle of proportionality. Until well after World War II ended in 1945, the norm of reciprocity provided a justification for conduct in armed conflict.

In 1993, the UN Security Council adopted a report from the Secretary-General and a Commission of Experts which concluded that the Geneva Conventions had passed into the body of customary international humanitarian law, thus making them binding on non-signatories to the Conventions whenever they engage in armed conflicts.

== Part I. General provisions ==
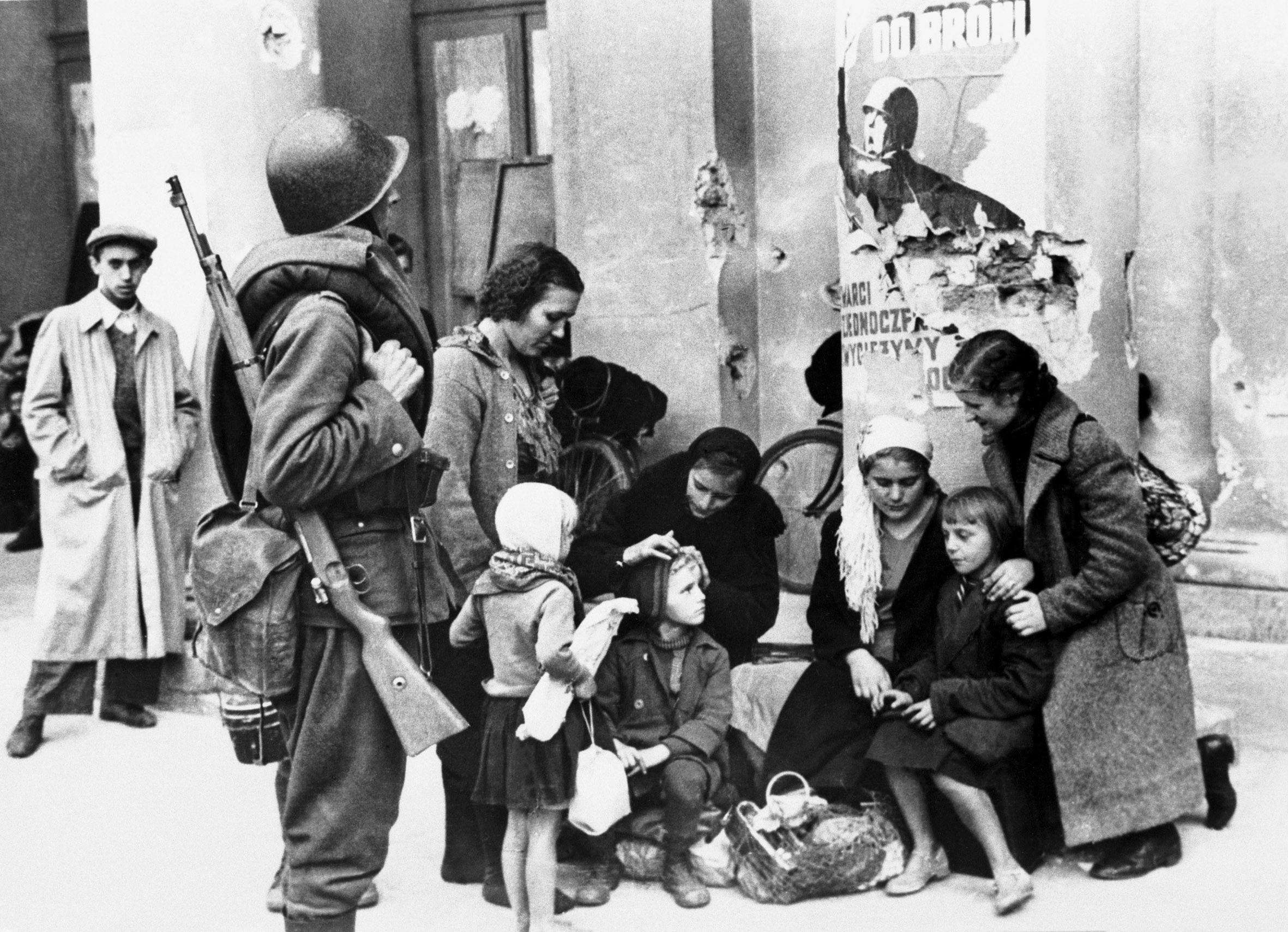
Warsaw 1939 refugees and soldier

This sets out the overall parameters for Geneva Convention IV:

=== Article 2: Application of the Convention ===
Article 2 states that signatories are bound by the convention both in war, armed conflicts where war has not been declared, and in an occupation of another country's territory.

In addition to the provisions which shall be implemented in peacetime, the present Convention shall apply to all cases of declared war or of any other armed conflict which may arise between two or more of the High Contracting Parties, even if the state of war is not recognized by one of them.

The scope of Article 2 is broad:

Although one of the Powers in conflict may not be a party to the present Convention, the Powers who are parties thereto shall remain bound by it in their mutual relations.

In the commentary to the article Jean Pictet writes:

They [conventions] are coming to be regarded less and less as contracts concluded on a basis of reciprocity in the national interests of the parties and more and more as a solemn affirmation of principles respected for their own sake, a series of unconditional engagements on the part of each of the Contracting Parties 'vis-à-vis ' the others.

=== Article 3: Conflicts not of an international character ===
Article 3 states that even where there is not a conflict of international character, the parties must as a minimum adhere to minimal protections described as: non-combatants, members of armed forces who have laid down their arms, and combatants who are hors de combat (out of the fight) due to wounds, detention, or any other cause shall in all circumstances be treated humanely, with the following prohibitions:

- (a) violence to life and person, in particular murder of all kinds, mutilation, cruel treatment and torture;
- (b) taking of hostages;
- (c) outrages upon personal dignity, in particular humiliating and degrading treatment;
- (d) the passing of sentences and the carrying out of executions without previous judgment pronounced by a regularly constituted court, affording all the judicial guarantees which are recognized as indispensable by civilized peoples.

=== Article 4: Definition of protected persons ===
Article 4 defines who is protected person:

Persons protected by the Convention are those who, at a given moment and in any manner whatsoever, find themselves, in case of a conflict or occupation, in the hands of a Party to the conflict or Occupying Power of which they are not nationals.

It explicitly excludes "Nationals of a State which is not bound by the Convention" and the citizens of a neutral state in the territory of a belligerent power or nationals of a co-belligerent state (i.e., allied nation) if that state has normal diplomatic relations "within the State in whose hands they are." Dr. Ola Engdahl wrote "[t]he purpose of excluding [these] nationals from the category of protected persons was that they could rely on diplomatic protection of the state of nationality. Persons are either protected persons under the convention or can benefit from the diplomatic protection of their state of nationality."

A number of articles specify how protecting powers, ICRC and other humanitarian organizations may aid protected persons.

The definition of protected person in this article is arguably the most important article in this section because many of the articles in the rest of GCIV only apply to protected persons.

=== Article 5: Derogations ===
Article 5 provides for the suspension of persons' rights under the convention for the duration of time that this is "prejudicial to the security of such State", although "such persons shall nevertheless be treated with humanity and, in case of trial, shall not be deprived of the rights of fair and regular trial prescribed by the present Convention."

The common interpretation of article 5 is that its scope is very limited. Derogation is limited to individuals "definitely suspected of" or "engaged in activities hostile to the security of the State." In paragraph two of the article, "spy or saboteur" is mentioned.

== Part II. General Protection of Populations Against Certain Consequences of War ==
=== Article 13: Field of application of part II ===
The provisions of Part II cover the whole of the populations of the countries in conflict, without any adverse distinction based, in particular, on race, nationality, religion or political opinion, and are intended to alleviate the sufferings caused by war.

The list of basis on which distinction might be drawn is not exhaustive.

=== Article 16: Wounded and Sick: General Protection ===
Rule 113 Treatment of the dead. The obligation to take all possible measures to prevent the dead from being despoiled (or pillaged).

== Part III. Status and Treatment of Protected Persons ==
=== Section I. Provisions common to the territories of the parties to the conflict and to occupied territories ===
==== Article 32: Prohibition of corporal punishment, torture, etc. ====
A protected person may not have anything done "of such a character as to cause physical suffering or extermination ... the physical suffering or extermination of protected persons in their hands. This prohibition applies to murder, torture, corporal punishments, mutilation and medical or scientific experiments not necessitated by the medical treatment. While popular debate remains on what constitutes a legal definition of torture, the ban on corporal punishment simplifies the matter; even the most mundane physical abuse is thereby forbidden by Article 32, as a precaution against alternate definitions of torture.

The prohibition on scientific experiments was added, in part, in response to experiments by German and Japanese doctors during World War II of whom Josef Mengele was the most infamous.

==== Article 33: Individual responsibility, collective penalties, pillage and reprisals ====
No protected person may be punished for any offense he or she has not personally committed. Collective penalties and likewise all measures of intimidation or of terrorism are prohibited.

Pillage is prohibited.

Reprisals against protected persons and their property is prohibited.

Article 33 explicitly outlaws collective punishment, establishing the principle that no protected person may be penalized for an offense they did not personally commit. Under the 1949 Geneva Conventions, collective punishment is a war crime. By collective punishment, the drafters of the Geneva Conventions had in mind the reprisal killings of World War I and World War II. In the First World War, the Germans executed Belgian villagers in mass retribution for resistance activity during the Rape of Belgium. In World War II, both German and Japanese forces carried out a form of collective punishment to suppress resistance. Entire villages or towns or districts were held responsible for any resistance activity that occurred at those places. The conventions, to counter this, reiterated the principle of individual responsibility. The International Committee of the Red Cross (ICRC) Commentary to the conventions states that parties to a conflict often would resort to "intimidatory measures to terrorize the population" in hopes of preventing hostile acts, but such practices "strike at guilty and innocent alike. They are opposed to all principles based on humanity and justice".

Additional Protocol II of 1977 is about the protection of victims of non-international armed conflicts explicitly forbidding collective punishment. But as fewer states have ratified this protocol than GCIV, GCIV Article 33 is the one more commonly quoted.

=== Section III. Occupied territories ===
Articles 47–78 impose substantial obligations on occupying powers. As well as numerous provisions for the general welfare of the inhabitants of an occupied territory, an occupier may not forcibly deport protected persons, or deport or transfer parts of its own civilian population into occupied territory (Art.49).

==== Article 49: Deportations, transfers, evacuations ====
Article 49. Individual or mass forcible transfers, as well as deportations of protected persons from occupied territory to the territory of the Occupying Power or to that of any other country, occupied or not, are prohibited, regardless of their motive.

Nevertheless, the Occupying Power may undertake total or partial evacuation of a given area if the security of the population or imperative military reasons so demand. Such evacuations may not involve the displacement of protected persons outside the bounds of the occupied territory except when for material reasons it is impossible to avoid such displacement. Persons thus evacuated shall be transferred back to their homes as soon as hostilities in the area in question have ceased.

The Occupying Power undertaking such transfers or evacuations shall ensure, to the greatest practicable extent, that proper accommodation is provided to receive the protected persons, that the removals are effected in satisfactory conditions of hygiene, health, safety and nutrition, and that members of the same family are not separated.

The Protecting Power shall be informed of any transfers and evacuations as soon as they have taken place.

The Occupying Power shall not detain protected persons in an area particularly exposed to the dangers of war unless the security of the population or imperative military reasons so demand.

The Occupying Power shall not deport or transfer parts of its own civilian population into the territory it occupies.

The reference in the last paragraph to "deportation", is commonly understood as the expulsion of foreign nationals, whereas the expulsion of nationals would be called extradition, banishment or exile. If ethnic groups are affected by deportation, it may also be referred to as population transfer. Transfer in this case literally means to move or pass from one place to another. The ICRC has expressed the opinion, "that international humanitarian law prohibits the establishment of settlements, as these are a form of population transfer into occupied territory".

==== Article 50: Children ====
Article 50. The Occupying Power shall, with the cooperation of the national and local authorities, facilitate the proper working of all institutions devoted to the care and education of children.

The Occupying Power shall take all necessary steps to facilitate the identification of children and the registration of their parentage. It may not, in any case, change their personal status, nor enlist them in formations or organizations subordinate to it.

Should the local institutions be inadequate for the purpose, the Occupying Power shall make arrangements for the maintenance and education, if possible by persons of their own nationality, language and religion, of children who are orphaned or separated from their parents as a result of the war and who cannot be adequately cared for by a near relative or friend.

A special section of the Bureau set up in accordance with Article 136 shall be responsible for taking all necessary steps to identify children whose identity is in doubt. Particulars of their parents or other near relatives should always be recorded if available.

The Occupying Power shall not hinder the application of any preferential measures in regard to food, medical care and protection against the effects of war which may have been adopted prior to the occupation in favour of children under fifteen years, expectant mothers, and mothers of children under seven.

==== Article 51: Recruitment of Protected persons ====
The Occupying Power may not compel protected persons to serve in its armed or auxiliary forces. No pressure or propaganda which aims at securing voluntary enlistment is permitted.

The Occupying Power may not compel protected persons to work unless they are over eighteen years of age, and then only on work which is necessary either for the needs of the army of occupation, or for the public utility services, or for the feeding, sheltering, clothing, transportation or health of the population of the occupied country. Protected persons may not be compelled to undertake any work which would involve them in the obligation of taking part in military operations. The Occupying Power may not compel protected persons to employ forcible means to ensure the security of the installations where they are performing compulsory labour.

The work shall be carried out only in the occupied territory where the persons whose services have been requisitioned are. Every such person shall, so far as possible, be kept in his usual place of employment. Workers shall be paid a fair wage and the work shall be proportionate to their physical and intellectual capacities. The legislation in force in the occupied country concerning working conditions, and safeguards as regards, in particular, such matters as wages, hours of work, equipment, preliminary training and compensation for occupational accidents and diseases, shall be applicable to the protected persons assigned to the work referred to in this Article.

In no case shall requisition of labour lead to a mobilization of workers in an organization of a military or semi-military character.

==== Article 53: Prohibited destruction ====
Article 53. Any destruction by the Occupying Power of real or personal property belonging individually or collectively to private persons, or to the State, or to other public authorities, or to social or cooperative organizations, is prohibited, except where such destruction is rendered absolutely necessary by military operations.

In The Geneva Conventions of 12 August 1949. Commentary, Jean Pictet writes:

To dissipate any misconception in regard to the scope of Article 53, it must be pointed out that the property referred to is not accorded general protection; the Convention merely provides here for its protection in occupied territory. The scope of the Article is therefore limited to destruction resulting from action by the Occupying Power. It will be remembered that Article 23 (g) of the Hague Regulations forbids the unnecessary destruction of enemy property; since that rule is placed in the section entitled "hostilities", it covers all property in the territory involved in a war; its scope is therefore much wider than that of the provision under discussion, which is only concerned with property situated in occupied territory.

==== Article 56: Hygiene and public health ====
Article 56 describes the medical obligations the occupying power has in the occupied territory:

To the fullest extent of the means available to it, the Occupying Power has the duty of ensuring and maintaining, with the cooperation of national and local authorities, the medical and hospital establishments and services, public health and hygiene in the occupied territory, with particular reference to the adoption and application of the prophylactic and preventive measures necessary to combat the spread of contagious diseases and epidemics. Medical personnel of all categories shall be allowed to carry out their duties.

If new hospitals are set up in occupied territory and if the competent organs of the occupied State are not operating there, the occupying authorities shall, if necessary, grant them the recognition provided for in Article 18. In similar circumstances, the occupying authorities shall also grant recognition to hospital personnel and transport vehicles under the provisions of Articles 20 and 21.

In adopting measures of health and hygiene and in their implementation, the Occupying Power shall take into consideration the moral and ethical susceptibilities of the population of the occupied territory.

==== Article 78: Security measures. Internment and assigned residence. Right of appeal ====
Article 78 deals with internment. It allows the occupying power for "imperative reasons of security" to "subject them [protected persons] to assigned residence or to internment". The article does not allow the occupying power to take collective measures: each case must be decided separately.

== Part IV. Execution of the Convention ==
This part contains "the formal or diplomatic provisions which it is customary to place at the end of an international Convention to settle the procedure for bringing it into effect are grouped together under this heading" (1). They are similar in all four Geneva Conventions.

== Annexes ==
The ICRC commentary on the Fourth Geneva convention states that when the establishment of hospital and safety zones in occupied territories were discussed reference was made to a draft agreement and it was agreed to append it as an annex I to the Fourth Geneva Convention.

The ICRC states that "the Draft Agreement has only been put forward to States as a model, but the fact that it as carefully drafted at the Diplomatic Conference, which finally adopted it, gives it a very real value. It could usefully be taken as a working basis, therefore, whenever a hospital zone is to be established."

The ICRC states that Annex II is a "draft which, according to Article 109 (paragraph 1) of the Convention, will be applied in the absence of special agreements between the Parties, deals with the conditions for the receipt and distribution of collective relief shipments. It is based on the traditions of the International Committee of the Red Cross which submitted it, and on the experience the Committee gained during the Second World War."

== See also ==
- Geneva Conventions of 1949
- Geneva Convention I
- Geneva Convention II
- Geneva Convention III
- International humanitarian law
- Non-combatant
- Civilian
- List of parties to the Geneva Conventions
- Universal Declaration of Human Rights
