= Joseph Théodore Dompierre =

Bavarian army medical officer (1800–1881)

Joseph Théodore Dompierre (October 8, 1800 in Vilseck, northeastern Bavaria, Germany; † March 4, 1881 in Munich.:) was a military medical officer in the Royal Bavarian army, Knight of the Bavarian Order of St. Michael, and delegate to the Geneva Conventions.

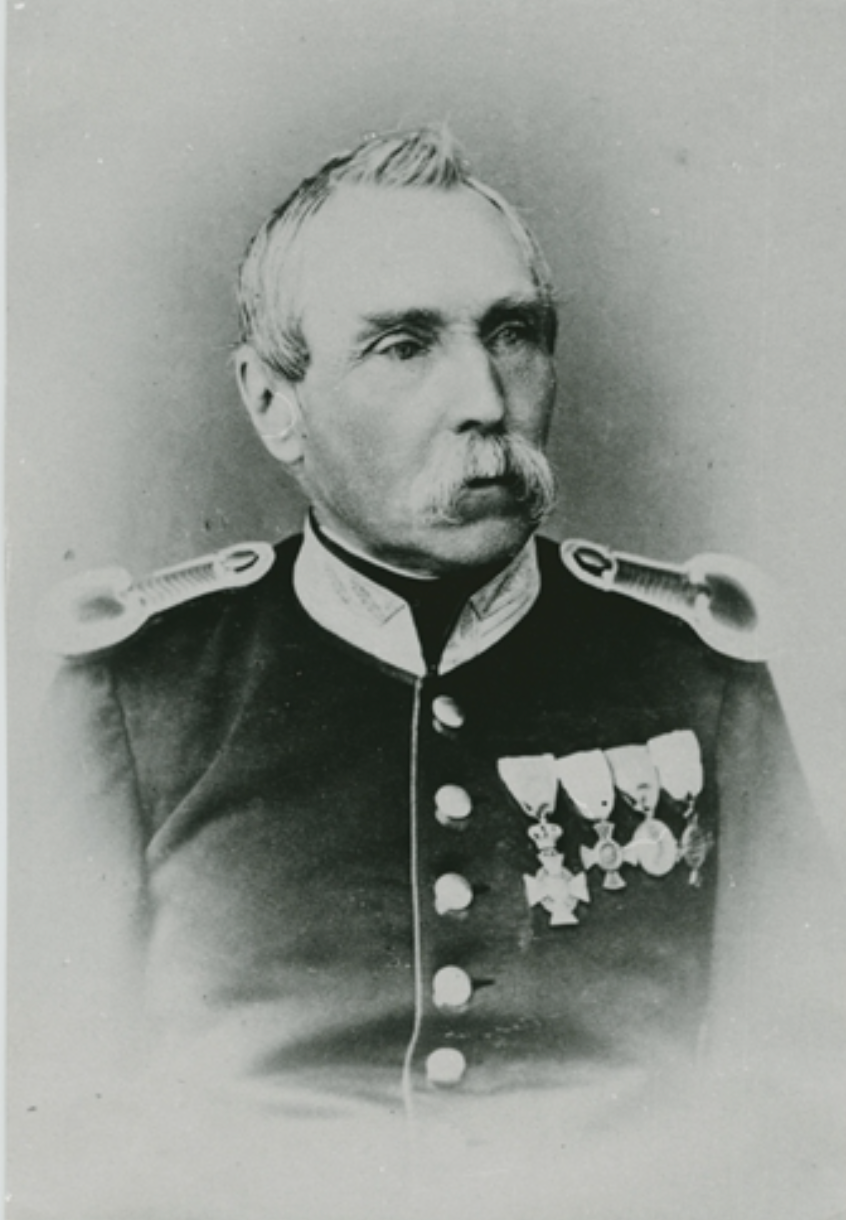
Dompierre as photographed at the Geneva Conference in 1860s

== Early life ==
Dr. Joseph Théodor Dompierre came from an old noble family in France, the Graten von Dompierre-Harcourt; his father was also a Knight of Malta and had served as a cadet in the French Guard under General Dumouriez. With this he emigrated in 1793 because, as a supporter of the monarchy, he felt just as much disgust at the battle of the revolutionary men as the general himself. While his relatives then went to Austria, where the name Dompierre is still honored. He settled at Vilseck in the Upper Palatinate, renounced his nobility, married there and founded a tobacco factory. On October 8, 1800, his son Joseph Theodor was born to him, who as a talented boy attended the Latin school and the grammar school in Amberg and distinguished himself by diligence and progress as well as by impeccable behavior; however, he graduated from the upper class in Bamberg, where he also took the two-year philosophical course at the Lyceum. In the autumn of 1822 he moved to the University of Würzburg and studied medicine for 6 semesters; Juliusspital offered ample resources for this study. After his doctorate on May 26, 1826, he accepted an assistant position in the general hospital in Bamberg as an introduction to medical practice.

== Military service ==
Dompierre soon decided to do military medical service, passed the test required for entry in 1827 and became on October 12, 1827, to sub-physicians in the Royal Bavarian 6th Infantry Regiment, at that time in Landau in the Palatinate, appointed. In 1833 he became battalion doctor 2nd Class, in 1839 1st class in the 9th Infantry Regiment, joined the 2nd Jäger Battalion in Germersheim in 1843 and in 1845 as regimental doctor 2nd class. He returned to Landau for the 9th Infantry Regiment, but in 1849 served as regimental doctor 1st class with his regiment to Würzburg, where he remained until 1857. In that year he was appointed medical officer at the commandantship in Landau, but in 1859 he was transferred to Germersheim.

After he had spent many years in good health in the Palatinate, in this garrison town, which was notorious for its fever, he was seized by a persistent, violent intermittent fever, which is why he had to seek a transfer; only in 1863 did he obtain this and came to the artillery corps command in Munich, where he advanced to Oberstabsarzt 2nd class in 1864 and 1st Classe in 1868.

In 1840 he married a young lady from Landau; his marriage was considered a most happy one, and they had children, 2 boys and 2 girls.

Dompierre served in the Palatinate in 1849 against the revolutionaries, and the ill-fated campaign of 1866 against Austria, which he took part in as senior staff doctor, had interrupted the monotonous life of the garrison and brought the horrors of the battlefield to his mind. But when the Franco-Prussian War of 1870 broke out, although active, he had to stay behind in his fatherland because of his old age. His youngest son Gustav, for whom his grandson Gustav Baermann was named, marched as a lieutenant in the hostile country and was killed in action in the Battle of Loigniy-Poupry. He was still listed as chief medical officer (of the artillery corps) at Munich in 1877

== Botanical Study ==
Dompierre's botanical activity must be emphasized; for in addition to his professional duties and further training in medicine, he pursued the much-loved study of plants from an early age until he was very old; but he did not neglect the remaining parts of natural science, but also studied physics, astronomy, and other things, even philosophy.

As a university student he had already acquired a great deal of knowledge in botany and set up a herbarium. When he came to the Rhine Palatinate, he immediately became a member of the "Pollichia", the well-known scientific association of the Rhine Palatinate, where botanists worked together at that time, for example:

- Dr. Karl H. Schultz, doctor in Deidesheim and author of a famous work on Compositae,
- Dr. Friedr. Willi. Schultz, author of the Palatinate flora;
- Mr. Bruch, a pharmacist in Zweibrücken,
- the famous bryologist, W. Theodor Gümbe, author of the Palatinate moss flora,
- Schimper zu Strasbourg, also a bryologist, who published the 'Mosses of Europe' in monographs with Bruch,
- G. Friedr. Cook, doctor and an excellent lichen expert.

Working with these botanists, Dr. Dompierre knew the Palatinate flora very precisely and was at the same time, through the influence of K. Schultz, prompted to a thorough study of the Hieracium. Dompierre owned a rich herbarium of this genus, which he later increased significantly in Würzburg. In Munich, too, he had access to the botanical garden, where under the director Hofrath Dr. von Nägeli, Hieracium have long been well cultivated and studied. Dompierre was noted as corresponding in the scientific journals of his day.

The many willow plantations (Saliaceae) on the banks of the Isar near Munich offered Dompierre rich material for study; he wandered there every day, observing and collecting. On such an excursion in 1864 he met two men who were just as busy collecting plants: Pastor Ohmüller and the pharmacist Schonger; both are known from the reports of the Pollichia botanical association, the former as the author of those previously found in Bavaria.

In 1873 he published a list of the hybrids (native and cultivated) in the area around Munich, but continued to work on the determination of the hybrid species and can therefore be considered an author of note in Weiden for Bavaria. In any case, his merit is the discovery and determination of the hybrids, which were new to Bavaria:

- Salix cinerea X purpurea Wim. = S. sordida Kerner = S. Pontederana Koch found in July 1873 near Murnau on the way to Mühlhagen.
- S. caprea X daphnoides Wirn. = S. erdingeri Kerner in the 'Salicetum' (an arboretum of Salix only) at Schleifsheim Palace, where it has been cultivated for over a decade under the name S. salviaefolia. Observed April–June 1873.
- S. caprea x purpurea Wim. – S. mauternensis Kerner, which was discovered by the latter in Lower Austria on the banks of the Danube near Mautern, 600' on Alluvion,

Dompierre could be observed on the Schliersee, August 1868; the following year, however, in April on the banks of the Rottach-Egern near Tegernsee botanizing.

According to a note on S. cinerea L., the following was written by Dompierre

"S. cinerea L. cinerea L. (an puras?) Var. stylis elongatis et germinibus grabrescentibus. – I observed this willow, an arborescing shrub, in the grounds of Feldafing since 1869, about 60 paces west of the jetty across from the Rose Island. For a long time I suspected it of hybridity, but found it difficult to unravel the particular descent and to find sufficient points of reference. I was thinking of relationships with nigricans or even to dasyclados when the cinerea predominates. After several years of observation alone, I had to decide, reluctantly, to give up the idea of hybridity and see this willow as a special form of S. cinerea."

Dompierre's willow herbarium (as yet to be located) was considered in its day the most complete since it contained many specimens of each species from different locations, both male and female, in flowers and fruits, with annual and perennial leaves, namely:

Salix in Dompierre's Herbarium
S. daphnoides Vill.	S. pentranda L.	S. fragilis L.	S. pruinosa Wendl.
S. alba L.,	S. triandra L.,	S. cinerea L.,	S. dasyclados Wim.,
S. lapponum L.,	S. incana Schrk.,	S. yiminalis L.	S. purpurea L.
S. aurita L.	S. grandifolia Ser. (these e.g. with over 100 copies)	S. caprea L	S. nigricans Fries
S. weigeliana Willd.	S. glabra Scop.	S. hastata L.	S. helvetica Vill.
S. glauca L.	S. pyrenaica Gouan.	S. myrsinites L.	S. caesia L.
S. arbuscula L.	S. myrtilloides L.	S. finnmarchica Willd.	S. livida Wahlenb.
S. mauternensis Kerner	S. petiolaris	S. babylonica L	S. reticulata L.
S. retusa L.	S. russeliana Koch	S. repens L.	S. undulata Ehrh.
S. speciosa Host.	S. cuspidata Schultz	S. seringeana Gaud.	S. salviaefolia Koch
S. hircina Kerner	S. intermedia Host.	S. wichurae Kerner	S. wimmeri Kerner
S. smithiana Willd.	S. calodendron Wim	S. holosericea Willd	S. doniana Smith.
S. acuminata Koch	S. rubra Huds.	S. humilis Willd.	S. erdingeri Kerner
S. sordida Kerner			

Dompierre also possessed many hybrids from the Wimmer Herbarium from the Forest Academy in Münden and other places;

== International Humanitarian Work ==
Dompierre was a delegate of the Kingdom of Bavaria to the conferences of the International Aid Committee for War Wounded in Geneva, Paris and Berlin. Bavaria, although not an original signatory of the first Geneva Convention in 1863, adhered to it in 1866 and Dompierre is recorded at the International Committee of the Red Cross as the Bavarian delegate at the conference in 1863. Doctors were an important group of delegates at the conventions as they saw the direct effects of war on the human body
