= First Geneva Convention =

First of four treaties of the Geneva Conventions, adopted in 1864

First Geneva Cоnvention
Convention (I) for the Amelioration of the Condition of the Wounded and Sick in Armed Forces in the Field
- Type: Multilateral treaty
- Signed: 12 August 1949
- Location: Geneva, Switzerland
- Effective: 21 October 1950
- Parties: 196 states: Afghanistan; Albania; Algeria; Andorra; Angola; Antigua and Barbuda; Argentina; Armenia; Australia; Austria; Azerbaijan; Bahamas; Bahrain; Bangladesh; Barbados; Belarus; Belgium; Belize; Benin; Bhutan; Bolivia; Bosnia and Herzegovina; Botswana; Brazil; Brunei; Bulgaria; Burkina Faso; Burundi; Cambodia; Cameroon; Canada; Cape Verde; Central African Republic; Chad; Chile; China; Colombia; Comoros; Cook Islands; Costa Rica; Croatia; Cuba; Cyprus; Czech Republic; DR Congo; Denmark; Djibouti; Dominica; Dominican Republic; Ecuador; Egypt; El Salvador; Equatorial Guinea; Eritrea; Estonia; Eswatini; Ethiopia; Federated States of Micronesia; Fiji; Finland; France; Gabon; Georgia; Germany; Ghana; Greece; Grenada; Guatemala; Guinea-Bissau; Guinea; Guyana; Haiti; Holy See; Honduras; Hungary; Iceland; India; Indonesia; Iran; Iraq; Ireland; Israel; Italy; Ivory Coast; Jamaica; Japan; Jordan; Kazakhstan; Kenya; Kiribati; Kuwait; Kyrgyzstan; Laos; Latvia; Lebanon; Lesotho; Liberia; Libya; Liechtenstein; Lithuania; Luxembourg; Madagascar; Malawi; Malaysia; Maldives; Mali; Malta; Marshall Islands; Mauritania; Mauritius; Mexico; Moldova; Monaco; Mongolia; Montenegro; Morocco; Mozambique; Myanmar; Namibia; Nauru; Nepal; Netherlands; New Zealand; Nicaragua; Niger; Nigeria; North Korea; North Macedonia; Norway; Oman; Pakistan; Palau; Palestine; Panama; Papua New Guinea; Paraguay; Peru; Philippines; Poland; Portugal; Qatar; Congo; Romania; Russia; Rwanda; Saint Kitts and Nevis; Saint Lucia; Saint Vincent and the Grenadines; Samoa; San Marino; São Tomé and Príncipe; Saudi Arabia; Senegal; Serbia; Seychelles; Sierra Leone; Singapore; Slovakia; Slovenia; Solomon Islands; Somalia; South Africa; South Korea; South Sudan; Spain; Sri Lanka; Sudan; Suriname; Sweden; Switzerland; Syria; Tajikistan; Tanzania; Thailand; Gambia; Timor-Leste; Togo; Tonga; Trinidad and Tobago; Tunisia; Turkey; Turkmenistan; Tuvalu; Uganda; Ukraine; United Arab Emirates; United Kingdom; United States; Uruguay; Uzbekistan; Vanuatu; Venezuela; Vietnam; Yemen; Zambia; Zimbabwe
- Depositary: Swiss Federal Council

The Geneva Convention (I) for the Amelioration of the Condition of the Wounded in Armies in the Field (French: Convention pour l'amélioration du sort des blessés et des malades dans les forces armées en campagne), more commonly referred to as the First Geneva Convention or Geneva Convention I and abbreviated as GCI, is the first of the four treaties of the 1949 Geneva Conventions. It defines "the basis on which rest the rules of international law for the protection of the victims of armed conflicts."

GCI is the fourth iteration of a series of Geneva Conventions, all of which sought to implement binding international arrangements for the protection of wounded armies. The first iteration was adopted in 1864, which was then significantly revised and replaced in 1906, 1929, and finally 1949

Geneva Convention I is inextricably linked to the International Committee of the Red Cross, which is both the instigator for the inception and enforcer of the articles in these conventions.

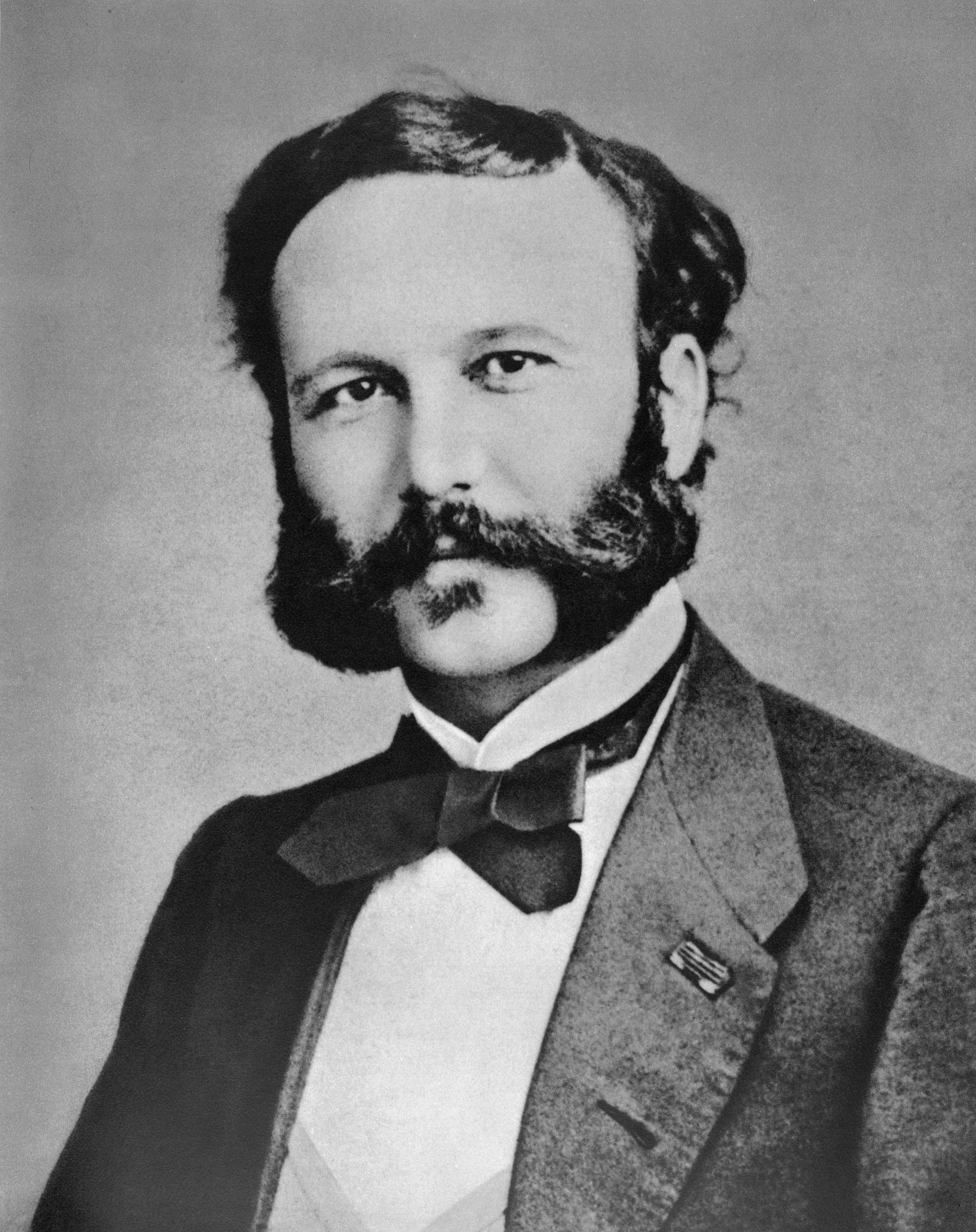
Henry Dunant, co-founder of the Red Cross

== Application ==
The convention "derived its obligatory force from the implied consent of the states which accepted and applied them in the conduct of their military operations." Despite its basic mandates, listed below, it was successful in effecting significant and rapid reforms. This first effort provided only for:

1. the immunity from capture and destruction of all establishments for the treatment of wounded and sick soldiers,
2. the impartial reception and treatment of all combatants,
3. the protection of civilians providing aid to the wounded, and
4. the recognition of the Red Cross symbol as a means of identifying persons and equipment covered by the agreement.

== Summary of provisions and revisions ==
Parties to Geneva Conventions and Protocols: Parties to GC I–IV and P I–III / Parties to GC I–IV and P I–II; Parties to GC I–IV and P I and III / Parties to GC I–IV and P I; Parties to GC I–IV and P III / Parties to GC I–IV and no P

The original ten articles of the 1864 treaty have been expanded to the current 64 articles. This lengthy treaty protects soldiers that are hors de combat (out of the battle due to sickness or injury), as well as medical and religious personnel, and civilians in the zone of battle. Among its principal provisions:

- Article 12 mandates that wounded and sick soldiers who are out of the battle should be humanely treated, and in particular should not be killed, injured, tortured, or subjected to biological experimentation. This article is the keystone of the treaty, and defines the principles from which most of the treaty is derived, including the obligation to respect medical units and establishments (Chapter III), the personnel entrusted with the care of the wounded (Chapter IV), buildings and material (Chapter V), medical transports (Chapter VI), and the protective sign (Chapter VII).
- Article 15 mandates that wounded and sick soldiers should be collected, cared for, and protected, though they may also become prisoners of war.
- Article 16 mandates that parties to the conflict should record the identity of the dead and wounded, and transmit this information to the opposing party.
- Article 9 allows the International Red Cross "or any other impartial humanitarian organization" to provide protection and relief of wounded and sick soldiers, as well as medical and religious personnel.

Due to significant ambiguities in the articles with certain terms and concepts and even more so to the rapidly developing nature of war and military technology, the original articles had to be revised and expanded, largely at the Second Geneva Conference in 1906 and Hague Conventions of 1899 and 1907 which extended the articles to maritime warfare. The 1906 version was updated and replaced by the 1929 version when minor modifications were made to it. It was again updated and replaced by the 1949 version, better known as the Final Act of Geneva Conference, 1949.

However, as Jean S. Pictet, Director of the International Committee of the Red Cross, noted in 1951, "the law, however, always lags behind charity; it is tardy in conforming with life's realities and the needs of humankind", as such it is the duty of the Red Cross "to assist in the widening the scope of law, on the assumption that…law will retain its value", principally through the revision and expansion of these basic principles of the original Geneva Convention.

For a detailed discussion of each article of the treaty, see the original text and the commentary. There are currently 196 countries party to the 1949 Geneva Conventions, including this first treaty but also including the other three.

== See also ==
- Geneva Conventions of 1949
- International Committee of the Red Cross
- International humanitarian law
- Non-combatant
- Hors de combat
- List of parties to the Geneva Conventions
- Saint Petersburg Declaration of 1868
- Geneva Convention II
- Geneva Convention III
- Geneva Convention IV
