= Geneva Convention on the Wounded and Sick =

1929 multilateral treaty

1929 Geneva Convention on the Wounded and Sick
Convention for the Amelioration of the Condition of the Wounded and Sick in Armies in the Field
- Type: Multilateral treaty
- Signed: 27 July 1929
- Location: Geneva, Switzerland
- Replaced by: First Geneva Convention of 1949
- Depositary: Switzerland

The Geneva Convention for the Amelioration of the Condition of the Wounded and Sick in Armies in the Field, consisting of 39 articles in French, was adopted on 27 July 1929, at the end of the Diplomatic Conference of Geneva of 1929, which met from the 27 July until the 1 August of that year.

It was the third convention to address the issues of wounded and sick combatants and was preceded by the Geneva Conventions of 1864 and 1906. The 1929 convention was replaced on 12 August 1949 by the First Geneva Convention.

There were three changes in the 1929 convention, to cover areas that during World War I were found to be deficient in the 1906 convention. The provisions concerning repatriation of the seriously wounded and seriously sick prisoners were transferred to the 1929 Geneva Convention on Prisoners of War. Aircraft flying medical missions were given similar protection to that of hospital ships. In addition to the Red Cross the emblems of the Red Crescent and of the Red Lion and Sun were recognized.
