= Second Geneva Convention =

1949 treaty

Geneva Convention (II) for the Amelioration of the Condition of Wounded, Sick and Shipwrecked Members of Armed Forces at Sea
- Type: Multilateral treaty
- Signed: 12 August 1949
- Location: Geneva, Switzerland
- Effective: 21 October 1950
- Parties: 196 states: Afghanistan; Albania; Algeria; Andorra; Angola; Antigua and Barbuda; Argentina; Armenia; Australia; Austria; Azerbaijan; Bahamas; Bahrain; Bangladesh; Barbados; Belarus; Belgium; Belize; Benin; Bhutan; Bolivia; Bosnia and Herzegovina; Botswana; Brazil; Brunei; Bulgaria; Burkina Faso; Burundi; Cambodia; Cameroon; Canada; Cape Verde; Central African Republic; Chad; Chile; China; Colombia; Comoros; Cook Islands; Costa Rica; Croatia; Cuba; Cyprus; Czech Republic; DR Congo; Denmark; Djibouti; Dominica; Dominican Republic; Ecuador; Egypt; El Salvador; Equatorial Guinea; Eritrea; Estonia; Eswatini; Ethiopia; Federated States of Micronesia; Fiji; Finland; France; Gabon; Georgia; Germany; Ghana; Greece; Grenada; Guatemala; Guinea-Bissau; Guinea; Guyana; Haiti; Holy See; Honduras; Hungary; Iceland; India; Indonesia; Iran; Iraq; Ireland; Israel; Italy; Ivory Coast; Jamaica; Japan; Jordan; Kazakhstan; Kenya; Kiribati; Kuwait; Kyrgyzstan; Laos; Latvia; Lebanon; Lesotho; Liberia; Libya; Liechtenstein; Lithuania; Luxembourg; Madagascar; Malawi; Malaysia; Maldives; Mali; Malta; Marshall Islands; Mauritania; Mauritius; Mexico; Moldova; Monaco; Mongolia; Montenegro; Morocco; Mozambique; Myanmar; Namibia; Nauru; Nepal; Netherlands; New Zealand; Nicaragua; Niger; Nigeria; North Korea; North Macedonia; Norway; Oman; Pakistan; Palau; Palestine; Panama; Papua New Guinea; Paraguay; Peru; Philippines; Poland; Portugal; Qatar; Congo; Romania; Russia; Rwanda; Saint Kitts and Nevis; Saint Lucia; Saint Vincent and the Grenadines; Samoa; San Marino; São Tomé and Príncipe; Saudi Arabia; Senegal; Serbia; Seychelles; Sierra Leone; Singapore; Slovakia; Slovenia; Solomon Islands; Somalia; South Africa; South Korea; South Sudan; Spain; Sri Lanka; Sudan; Suriname; Sweden; Switzerland; Syria; Tajikistan; Tanzania; Thailand; Gambia; Timor-Leste; Togo; Tonga; Trinidad and Tobago; Tunisia; Turkey; Turkmenistan; Tuvalu; Uganda; Ukraine; United Arab Emirates; United Kingdom; United States; Uruguay; Uzbekistan; Vanuatu; Venezuela; Vietnam; Yemen; Zambia; Zimbabwe
- Depositary: Swiss Federal Council

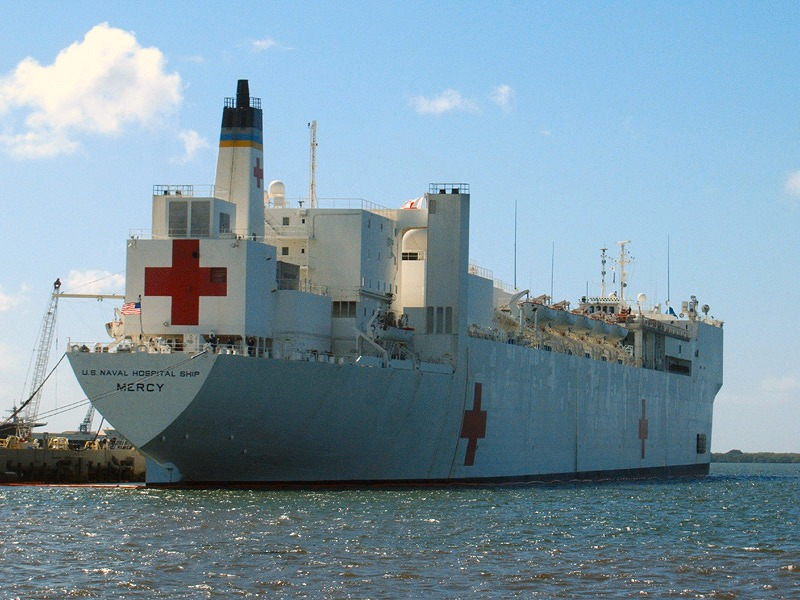
Hospital ship USNS Mercy of the United States Navy

The Geneva Convention (II) for the Amelioration of the Condition of Wounded, Sick and Shipwrecked Members of Armed Forces at Sea (French: Convention pour l'amélioration du sort des blessés, des malades et des naufragés des forces armées sur mer), more commonly referred to as the Second Geneva Convention or Geneva Convention II and abbreviated as GCII, is one of the four treaties of the 1949 Geneva Conventions. It was first adopted in 1949, replacing the Hague Convention (X) of 1907. It adapts the main protective regime of the First Geneva Convention to combat at sea.

== Summary of provisions ==
Parties to Geneva Conventions and Protocols: Parties to GC I–IV and P I–III / Parties to GC I–IV and P I–II; Parties to GC I–IV and P I and III / Parties to GC I–IV and P I; Parties to GC I–IV and P III / Parties to GC I–IV and no P

Geneva Convention II is a lengthy document consisting of 63 articles. The most essential provisions of the treaty are:

- Articles 12 and 18 require all parties to protect and care for the wounded, sick, and shipwrecked.
- Article 14 clarifies that although a warship cannot capture a hospital ship's medical staff, it can hold the wounded, sick, and shipwrecked as prisoners of war.
- Article 21 allows appeals to be made to neutral vessels to help collect and care for the wounded, sick, and shipwrecked. The neutral vessels cannot be captured.
- Articles 36 and 37 protect religious and medical personnel serving on a combat ship.
- Article 22 states that hospital ships cannot be used for any military purpose, and owing to their humanitarian mission, they cannot be attacked or captured.

For a detailed discussion of each article of the treaty, see the original text and the commentary. There are currently 196 countries party to the 1949 Geneva Conventions, including this second treaty but also including the other three.

== See also ==
- Geneva Conventions of 1949
- Geneva Convention I
- Geneva Convention III
- Geneva Convention IV
- International humanitarian law
- Non-combatants
- Hors de combat
- List of parties to the Geneva Conventions
