= Protocol II to the Geneva Conventions =

1977 amendment protocol to the Geneva Conventions

Geneva Conventions Protocol II
Protocol Additional to the Geneva Conventions of 12 August 1949, and relating to the Protection of Victims of Non-International Armed Conflicts (Protocol II)
- Type: Protocol
- Drafted: 20 February 1974 – 8 June 1977
- Signed: 8 June 1977
- Location: Geneva
- Effective: 7 December 1978
- Condition: Six months after two instruments ratification or accession were deposited
- Signatories: 3 States: Islamic Republic of Iran; Pakistan; United States of America
- Parties: 170 States: Afghanistan; Albania; Algeria; Andorra; Angola; Antigua and Barbuda; Argentina; Armenia; Australia; Austria; Bahamas; Bahrain; Bangladesh; Barbados; Belarus; Belgium; Belize; Benin; Bolivia; Bosnia and Herzegovina; Botswana; Brazil; Brunei Darussalam; Bulgaria; Burkina Faso; Burundi; Cabo Verde; Cambodia; Cameroon; Canada; Central African Republic; Chad; Chile; China; Colombia; Comoros; Congo; Costa Rica; Côte d'Ivoire; Croatia; Cuba; Cyprus; Czech Republic; DR Congo; Denmark; Djibouti; Dominica; Dominican Republic; Ecuador; Egypt; El Salvador; Equatorial Guinea; Estonia; Eswatini; Ethiopia; Fiji; Finland; France; Gabon; Gambia; Georgia; Germany; Ghana; Greece; Grenada; Guatemala; Guinea; Guinea-Bissau; Guyana; Haiti; Holy See; Honduras; Hungary; Iceland; Ireland; Italy; Jamaica; Japan; Jordan; Kazakhstan; Kenya; Kuwait; Kyrgyzstan; Lao People's Democratic Republic; Latvia; Lebanon; Lesotho; Liberia; Libya; Liechtenstein; Lithuania; Luxembourg; Madagascar; Malawi; Maldives; Mali; Malta; Mauritania; Mauritius; Micronesia (Federated States of); Monaco; Mongolia; Montenegro; Morocco; Mozambique; Namibia; Nauru; Netherlands; New Zealand; Nicaragua; Niger; Nigeria; North Macedonia; Norway; Oman; Palau; Palestine; Panama; Paraguay; Peru; Philippines; Poland; Portugal; Qatar; Republic of Korea; Republic of Moldova; Romania; Russian Federation; Rwanda; Saint Kitts and Nevis; Saint Lucia; Saint Vincent and the Grenadines; Samoa; San Marino; São Tomé and Príncipe; Saudi Arabia; Senegal; Serbia; Seychelles; Sierra Leone; Slovakia; Slovenia; Solomon Islands; South Africa; South Sudan; Spain; Sudan; Suriname; Sweden; Switzerland; Tajikistan; Timor-Leste; Togo; Tonga; Trinidad and Tobago; Tunisia; Turkmenistan; Uganda; Ukraine; United Arab Emirates; United Kingdom of Great Britain and Northern Ireland; United Republic of Tanzania; Uruguay; Uzbekistan; Vanuatu; Venezuela; Yemen; Zambia; Zimbabwe
- Depositary: Swiss Federal Council
- Languages: English, Arabic, Chinese, Spanish, French, Russian

Full text
- Geneva Convention/Protocol II at Wikisource

A map showing the current status of Protocol by country, as of July 2025: State parties (170) State signatories (3) Neither

Protocol II (also Additional Protocol II or AP II) is a 1977 amendment or optional protocol to the Geneva Conventions of 1949 relating to the protection of victims of non-international armed conflicts. It defines certain international laws that strive to provide better protection for victims of internal armed conflicts that take place within the borders of a single country. The scope of these laws is more limited than those of the rest of the Geneva Conventions out of respect for sovereign rights and duties of national governments.

As of July 2025, the Protocol had been ratified by 170 countries, with the United States, India, Pakistan, Turkey, Iran, Iraq, Syria, and Israel being notable exceptions. However, the United States, Iran, and Pakistan signed it on 12 December 1977, which signifies an intention to work towards ratifying it. The Iranian signature was given prior to the 1979 Iranian Revolution.

According to legal scholar and human rights attorney Noura Erakat, the Israeli non-ratification of Protocol I and II to the Geneva Conventions allows the Israeli government to recognize the Israeli-Palestinian conflict ''neither as a civil war ('non-international armed conflict,' NIAC) nor a war against a liberation movement ('international armed conflict,' IAC).'' This way, force used by Palestinian factions can be deemed illegal and illegitimate.

Some, but not all, of the provisions of the 1977 Additional Protocol II, “have obtained recognition as customary law.”

== Overview ==
Historically, international law of armed conflict addressed traditional declarations of war between nations. When the Geneva Conventions were updated in 1949 after the Second World War, delegates sought to define certain minimum humanitarian standards to situations that had all the characteristics of war, without being an international war.

These negotiations resulted in Article 3, common to all four of the basic treaties of the Geneva Conventions of 1949. Common Article 3 applies to armed conflicts that are not of an international character, but that are contained within the boundaries of a single country. It provides limited protection to victims, including:

- Persons taking no active part in hostilities should be treated humanely (including military persons who have ceased to be active as a result of sickness, injury, or detention).
- The wounded and sick shall be collected and cared for.

By the 1970s, diplomats were attempting to negotiate clarifications to the brief language of Article 3, and to extend the scope of international law to cover additional humanitarian rights in the context of internal conflicts. These efforts resulted in Protocol II of the Geneva Conventions. The debate over this protocol centered on two conflicting ideas. First, that the distinction between internal and international armed conflict is artificial from the point of view of a victim. Humanitarian principles should apply regardless of the identity of the combatants. Second, that international law does not apply to non-international situations. A nation has sovereignty within its borders, and must not accept judgments by and orders from other countries. And Article 6, section 2, also prohibits collective punishment.

== See also ==
- Geneva Conventions
- Third Geneva Convention, on the treatment of prisoners of war
- Fourth Geneva Convention, on the treatment of civilians during wartime
- Protocol I, a 1977 amendment adopted addressing the protection of victims in international conflicts
- Protocol III, a 2005 amendment adopted specifying the adoption of the Red Crystal emblem
- List of parties to the Geneva Conventions: includes a list of states that signed and a list of states that have ratified Protocol II
- Law of war, also known as international humanitarian law
- Distinction (law), the principle of distinction between combatants and civilians in armed conflict
