= Hors de combat =

Soldiers unable to fight

In the law of war, combatants are considered to be hors de combat (French: [ɔʁ də kɔ̃ba]; lit. 'out of combat'), and thus protected persons, when they are unable to participate in fighting. Hors de combat personnel may not be intentionally targeted. Examples include persons parachuting from their disabled aircraft, shipwreck survivors, as well as the sick, wounded, detained, or otherwise disabled. Intentional hostility from assumed hors de combat persons removes any legal protection on their part and renders them as active combatants once again.

Under the 1949 Geneva Conventions, enemy combatants hors de combat are non-combatants and automatically granted the status of protected persons. Lawful combatants hors de combat receive prisoner of war (POW) status and cannot be prosecuted for simply partaking in hostilities. Some countries recognize a status of unlawful combatants which are not entitled to hors de combat protections.

Protocol I to the Geneva Conventions defines a person as hors de combat if:

(a) he is in the power of an adverse Party;
(b) he clearly expresses an intention to surrender; or
(c) he has been rendered unconscious or is otherwise incapacitated by wounds or sickness, and therefore is incapable of defending himself;

provided that in any of these cases he abstains from any hostile act and does not attempt to escape.

== See also ==
- Non-combatant
- Geneva Conventions of 1949
