= Symbol of medicine =

The symbol of medicine may refer to:

- Emblems of the International Red Cross and Red Crescent Movement
- Star of Life
- Rod of Asclepius

== See also ==
- Caduceus, often mistakenly used as a symbol of medicine due to confusion with the Rod of Asclepius
- Red Cross Youth Song
