= Additional Protocol =

Additional Protocol refers to an addition to an international treaty. Additional Protocol may refer to:

- Additional Protocol to a comprehensive safeguards agreement, approved by the IAEA Board of Governors in 1997
- Geneva Conventions have three additional (optional) protocols to them:
  - Protocol I (1977)
  - Protocol II (1977)
  - Protocol III (2005)
