= Star of Life =

Emergency medical service symbol

The Star of Life represents emergency medical services such as ambulances.

The Star of Life is a symbol used to identify emergency medical services. It features a blue six-pointed star, outlined by a white border. The middle contains a Rod of Asclepius – an ancient symbol of medicine. The Star of Life can be found on ambulances, medical personnel uniforms, and other objects associated with emergency medicine or first aid. Elevators marked with the symbol indicate the lift is large enough to hold a stretcher. Medical bracelets or tags sometimes use the symbol to indicate that the bearer has a medical condition that emergency services may need to know.

The Star of Life is widely used around the world, but like many international symbols, it has not been adopted everywhere. In some countries, its use is restricted to authorized personnel.

== History ==
Generic emergency medical services flag

The Star of Life originated in the United States. In 1963, the American Medical Association (AMA) designed the Star of Life as a "universal" symbol for medical identification. The AMA did not trademark or copyright the symbol, stating it was being "freely offered" to manufacturers, and also was for use on cards carried by persons with a medical condition.

By way of a 1964 resolution, it was adopted by the World Medical Association "as the universal emergency medical information symbol." The Star of Life was promoted by the American Red Cross and rapidly adopted worldwide.

In 1970, when the American Medical Association's Committee on Emergency Medical Services formed the National Registry of Emergency Medical Technicians (NREMT), the AMA chose the Star of Life to designate nationally certified Emergency Medical Services personnel. In 1973, the NREMT filed for a trademark for the Star of Life logo, under the category of a collective membership mark. This version featured a Star of Life enveloped by a circle. NREMT's trademark was granted in 1975, but "was not renewed and therefore has expired." NREMT subsequently registered a service mark featuring a Star of Life and the words "NATIONAL REGISTRY." This logo's trademark remains active.

Prior to the use of the Star of Life, ambulances in the United States commonly displayed a safety orange-colored cross on a square background. This was only a slight variation from the inverted Swiss flag (✚) used by the International Red Cross and Red Crescent Movement. In 1973, the American Red Cross complained that the traditional orange cross too closely resembled their logo of a red cross on a white background, the usage of which is restricted by the Geneva Conventions. Dr. Dawson Mills, Chief of the EMS Branch, National Highway Traffic Safety Administration in the United States, asked the National Registry of EMTs for permission to use the star as the "national identifier for Emergency Medical Services" in the United States," and in 1977 reported to Congress that it had become the national standard.

Leo R. Schwartz, Chief of the EMS Branch, National Highway Traffic Safety Administration in the United States, modified the Star of Life by adding the six main tasks of Emergency Medical Services and changing the color from red (used by the AMA) to blue. The "blue Star of Life" was recommended for adoption by the United States Department of Health, Education and Welfare on October 25, 1973, and was registered as a certification mark on February 1, 1977 in the name of the National Highway Traffic Safety Administration. Both NREMT's version and the US government's modification omit the white outline around the edge common on many of today's ambulances.

The US government's registration lists uses of the Star of Life, including "emergency medical care" and "emergency medical care vehicles." The US government's registration does not list any international classes of trademark.

Federal standards dictate requirements ambulances in the US must satisfy in order to display the Star of Life. The federal government has given states additional authority to manage the symbol. Private ambulance operators like AMR have trademarked logos featuring an embedded Star of Life.

== Symbolism ==
Six points on the Star of Life

The six branches of the star represent the six main tasks executed by rescuers all through the emergency chain:

1. Detection: The first rescuers on the scene, usually untrained civilians or those involved in the incident, observe the scene, understand the problem, identify the dangers to themselves and the others, and take appropriate measures to ensure their safety on the scene (environmental, electricity, chemicals, radiation, etc.).
2. Reporting: The call for professional help is made and dispatch is connected with the victims, providing emergency medical dispatch.
3. Response: The first rescuers provide first aid and immediate care to the extent of their capabilities.
4. On scene care: The EMS personnel arrive and provide immediate care to the extent of their capabilities on-scene.
5. Care in transit: The EMS personnel proceed to transfer the patient to a hospital via an ambulance or helicopter for specialized care. They provide medical care during the transportation.
6. Transfer to definitive care: Appropriate specialized care is provided at the hospital.

== Global usage ==
=== Africa ===
Egyptian Ministry of Health ambulances display the Star of Life on one rear door, and a red crescent on the other.

=== Asia ===
==== East Asia ====
Ambulances in Taiwan, mainland China, Hong Kong, and Macau display the Star of Life. The symbol is also widely used in Japan, Malaysia, the Philippines, and Singapore. It is less common in South Korea, where ambulances display a green cross and green lights.

==== West and Central Asia ====
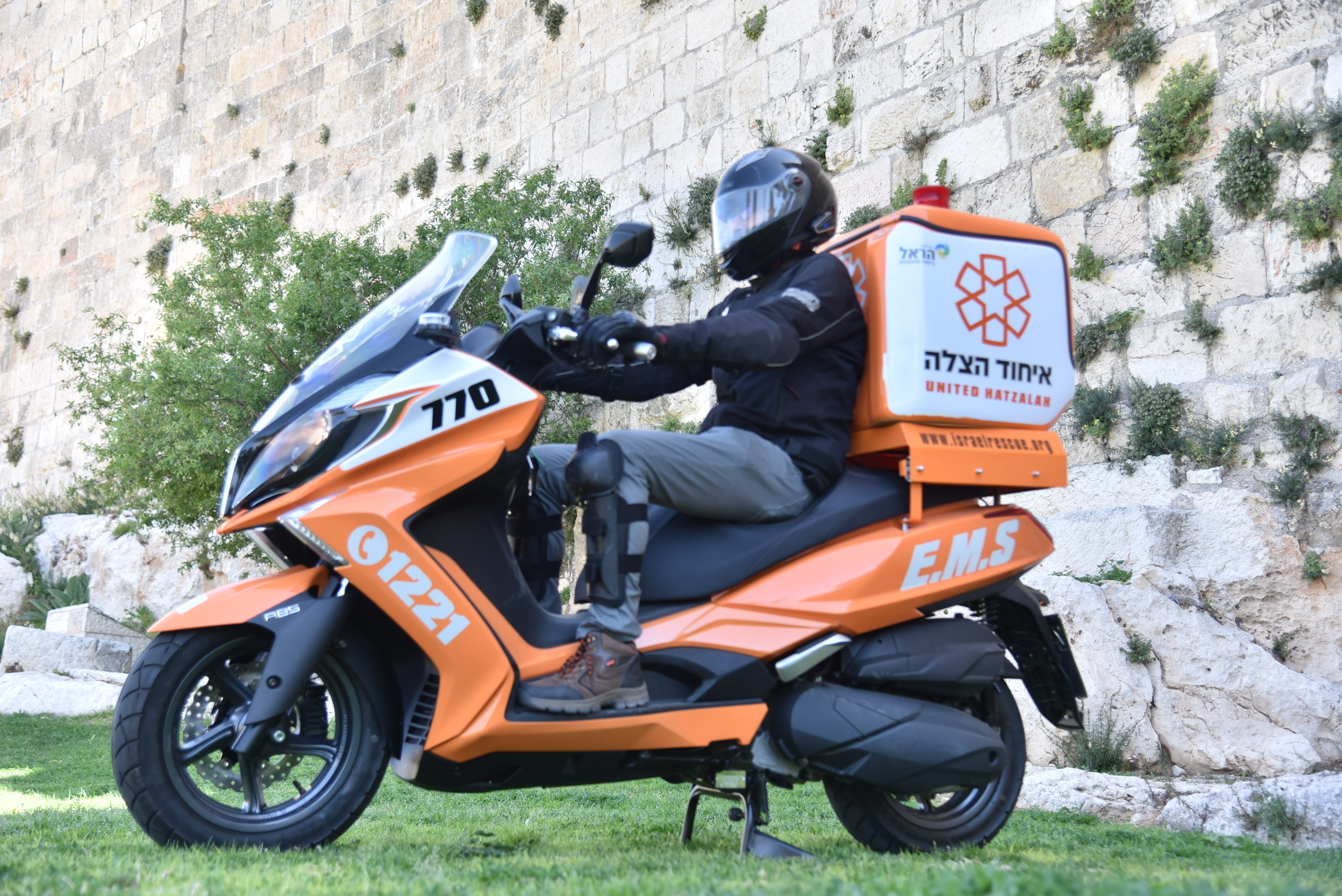
An ambulance motorcycle from Israel's United Hatzalah, combining the Star of David with the Star of Life.

Most ambulances in Turkey do not use the Star of Life. Ambulances in Iran commonly display the Star of Life. National ambulances in the United Arab Emirates do not display the Star of Life, instead showing an EKG graphic on the sides and rear. In Saudi Arabia, the Red Crescent Society answers the emergency line, and provides service in vehicles bearing the red crescent emblem.

In Israel, Magen David Adom displays a red Jewish star, sometimes shown with a Star of Life. The Jewish star is paired with the red crystal in times of conflict. Israel's other ambulance operator, United Hatzalah, has a logo based on both stars. "The Star of Life is a universal symbol of emergency medical care. The Star of David is our national symbol. Combining these two elements reminds us of the messages that we...focus on." said United Hatzalah's president.

In Palestine, the Palestine Red Crescent Society provides ambulance service in vehicles displaying a red crescent, alongside private operators who often display the Star of Life.

==== South Asia ====
Indian Automotive Industry Standard AIS-125 is the National Ambulance Code of India. This document is managed jointly by the Automotive Research Association and the Ministry of Road Transport and Highways. It requires ambulances display several distinctive markings including a reflective Battenburg pattern, the word "AMBULANCE", and the emergency telephone number. The standard states "Displayed on the upper half of the left side should be a 'Star of Life' symbol, with a size of 40 × 40 cm... Displayed on the left back window should be a 'Star of Life' symbol, with a size of 85% of the window".

=== Central and South America ===
The Star of Life is used in many Spanish speaking nations, where it is known as La Estrella de la vida. In Argentina, the Sistema de Atención Médica de Emergencia (SAME), the capital district ambulance service, uses a green and slightly rounded version of the Star of Life in their logo. In Brazil, the Star of Life is known by its Portuguese name Estrela da Vida. A red Star of Life is incorporated into the national emergency service's visual identity standards. Brazil's ABNT Standard NBR 14561 for ambulance design makes direct reference to being based on the American Star of Life vehicle. Ambulances which do not comply with the Brazilian standard are prohibited from displaying the Star of Life or the word “RESGATE” (rescue).

=== Australia and New Zealand ===
Cross of the Order of St. John

A few patient transport providers like Ambulance Service Australia use the Star of Life. However, it is far more common to see the Maltese Cross in this region.

=== Europe ===
The European Union's ambulance design standard CEN 1789 in section A1 Recognition and Visibility of Ambulances states:

With the exception of Red Cross societies or where the "Star of life" is locally registered, a blue reflective "Star of life" emblem (minimum size 500 mm) together with reflective letters, numerals or a symbol identifying the organization and the vehicle, should be applied to the roof of the ambulance...a blue reflective "Star of life" emblem should [also] be applied to the sides and rear of the ambulance.

In Portugal, the Star of Life is referred to by the Portuguese name Estrela da Vida. In March 1977, the then National Ambulance Service of Portugal (the present INEM, National Medical Emergency Institute) filed a trademark registration on the symbol, which was granted in 1981. The INEM continues to hold a trademark registration in the country, which is used to certify that vehicles are "in accordance with INEM standards" and personnel have "proper preparation". It may also be used on maps and road signs "to indicate the location or access to qualified emergency medical care services".

Belgian EMTs use blue stars; nurses, doctors, and ambulance drivers wear other colors. In the Netherlands, the Star of Life is widely used. The Dutch government owns a trademark on the symbol, alongside the paint scheme used on emergency vehicles.

After Latvia became independent in 1918, ambulance services in the 1920s and 1930s were provided by the Latvian Red Cross and thus displayed the Red Cross symbol. During the Soviet control of Latvia, that symbol continued to be used as a general symbol of medicine. As restoration of independence, the Riga Emergency Medical Service Station called on the government to adopt the Star of Life (Latvian: Dzīvības zvaigzne, sometimes sniegpārsla - 'snowflake') and the change was made with effect from 12 January 1995. It is currently used on vehicles, uniforms and medical service buildings.

In Germany, the symbol was registered in 1993 by industry association BKS, an umbrella organization for private rescue services there. In December 2020, another ambulance industry association, DBRD, filed a challenge with the German Patent and Trade Mark Office. The challengers hired a law firm specializing in intellectual property rights to research the symbol's history. This led to allegations the Star of Life had already been in widespread public use since the 1960s, before being registered in Germany (or the US for that matter). The challengers claimed the trademark office seemed to have been not properly informed of these facts, which presumably could have led the original application to have been denied on public domain grounds. The European Union Intellectual Property Office's 2014 rejection of a trademark on a minimally modified Star of Life was also cited. As of August 2022, BKS continues to hold German copyright on the symbol.

In the United Kingdom, some NHS ambulances in the UK display the Star of Life in addition to the local Ambulance Service emblem. These (latter) emblems have a pale gold six-spoked wheel with a Rod of Asclepius in the foreground. A crown and Maltese Cross, a common EMS emblem in Commonwealth nations, are included in the design.

== Gallery ==
The symbol in use
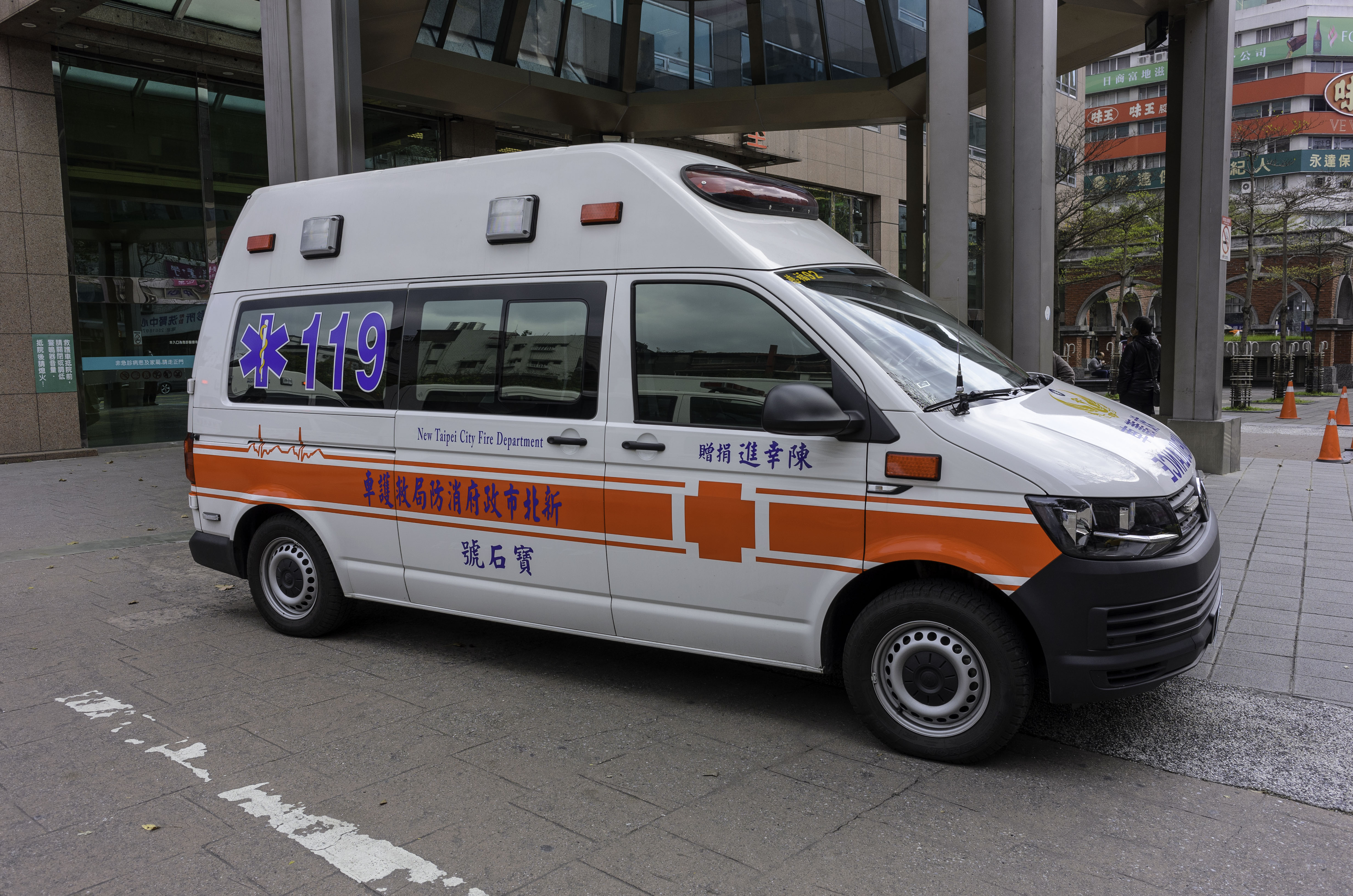
New Taipei City Fire Department ambulance in Taiwan

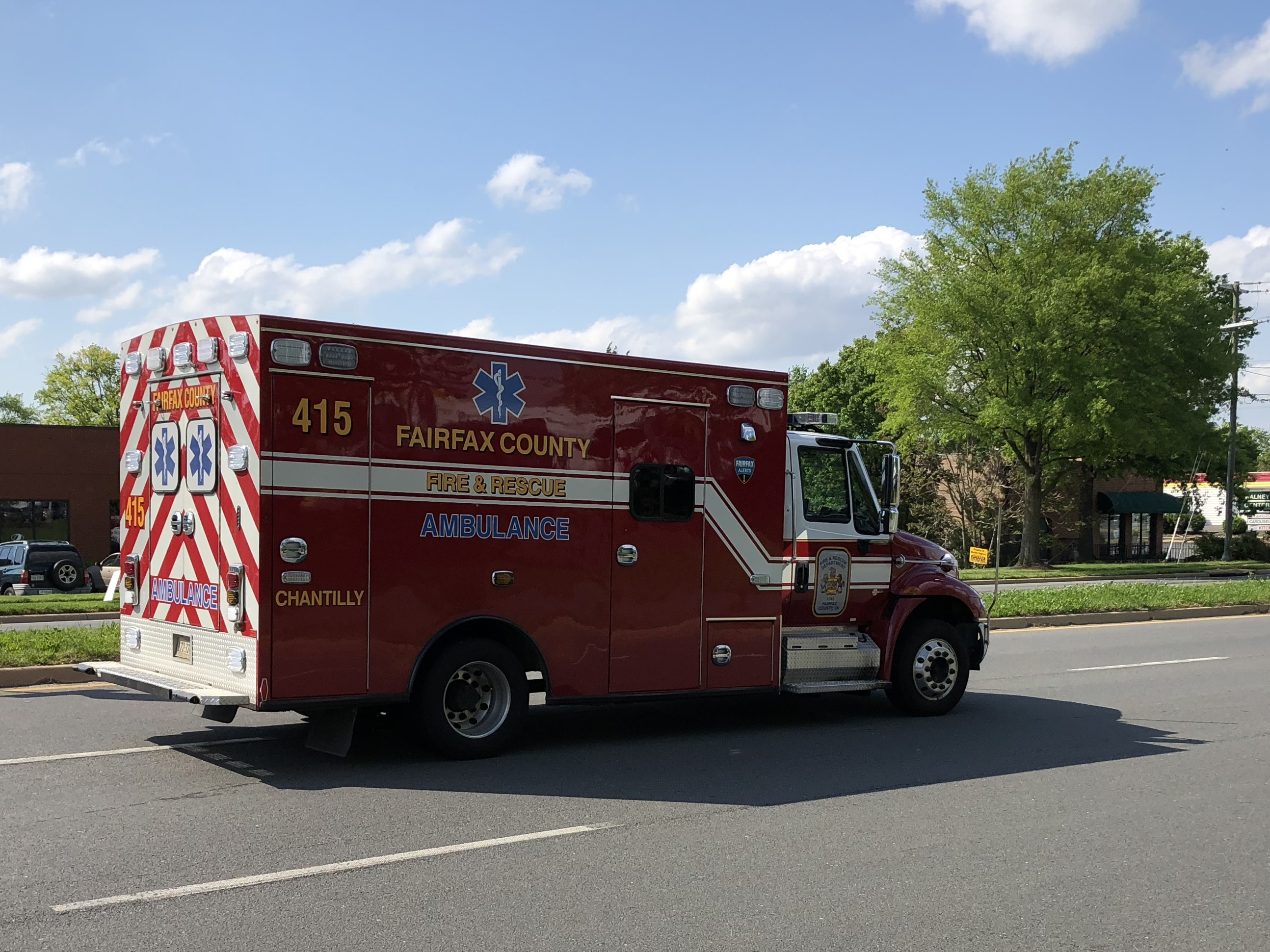
Fire department ambulance in Fairfax County, Virginia, US

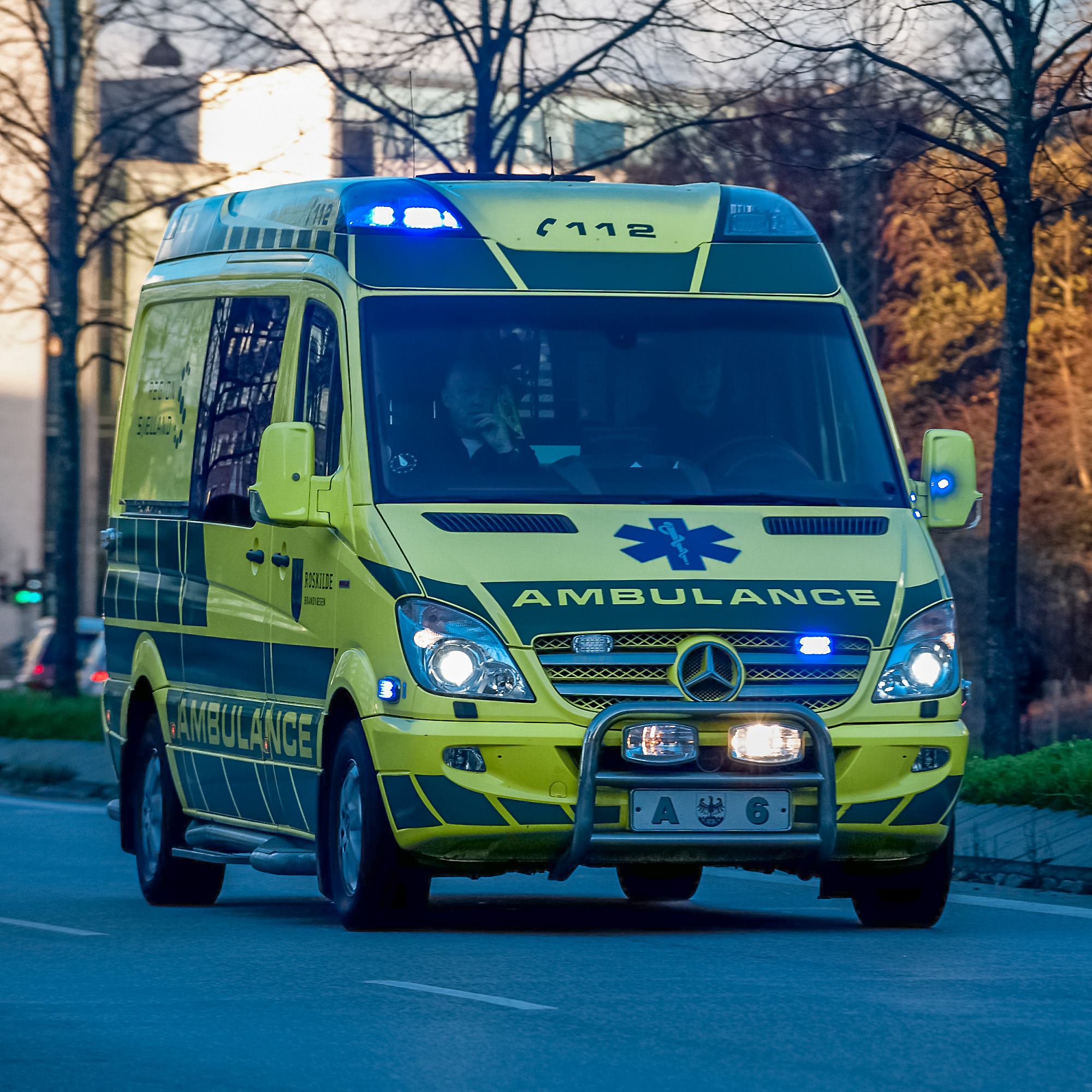
An ambulance in Denmark

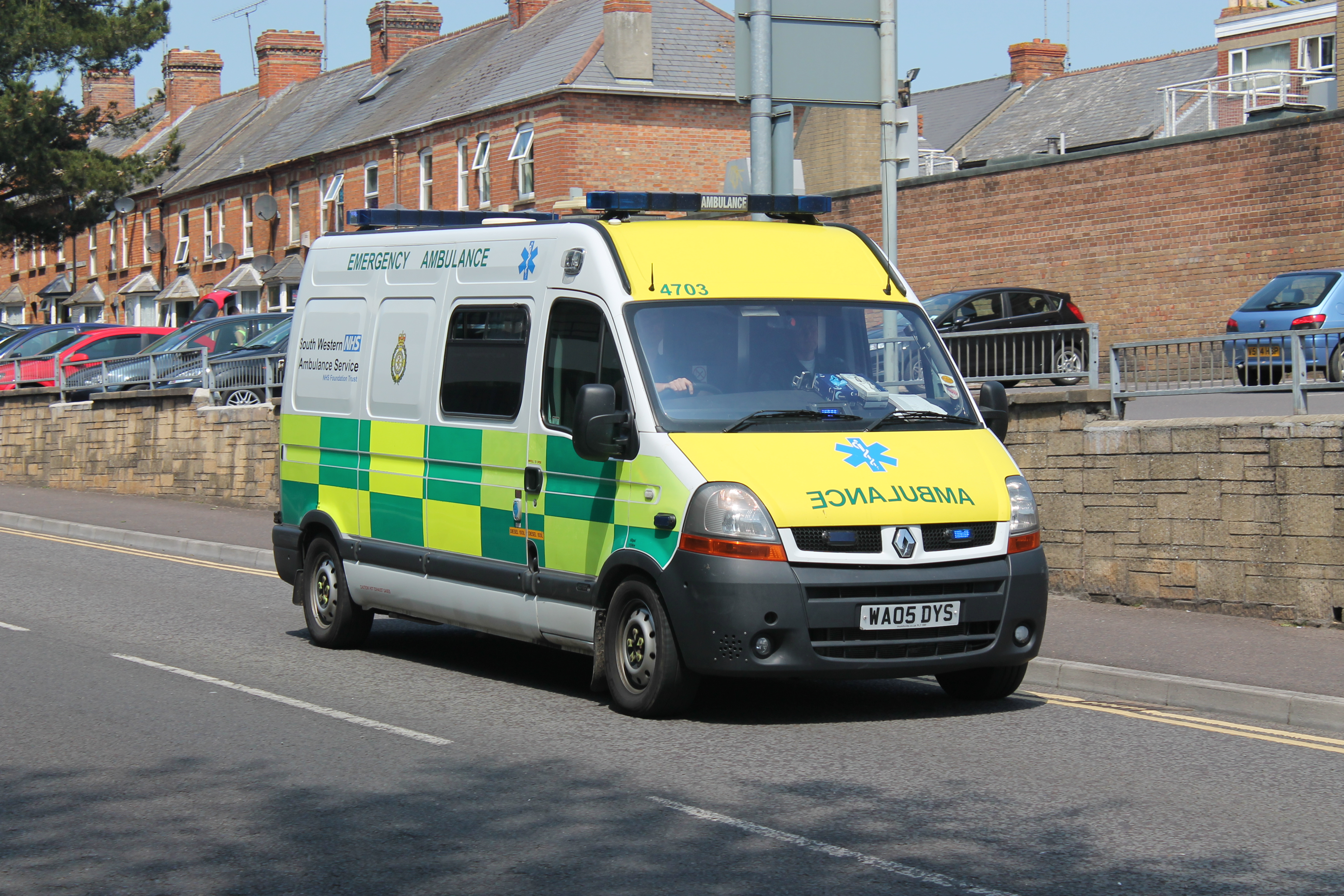
An NHS ambulance in England, marked with Star of Life and the local ambulance service emblem

== Unicode ==
⚕o

Staff of Aesculapius
- In Unicode: U+2695 ⚕ STAFF OF AESCULAPIUS

Related
- See also: U+2731 ✱ HEAVY ASTERISK; U+1F7BA 🞺 EXTREMELY HEAVY SIX SPOKED ASTERISK

The snake-and-staff element of the symbol has a Unicode code point called the Staff of Aesculapius. Unicode has no dedicated code point for the Star of Life.

== See also ==
- First aid
- Emergency medical technician
- Emblems of the International Red Cross and Red Crescent Movement
