= Protected persons =

Legal term in international humanitarian law

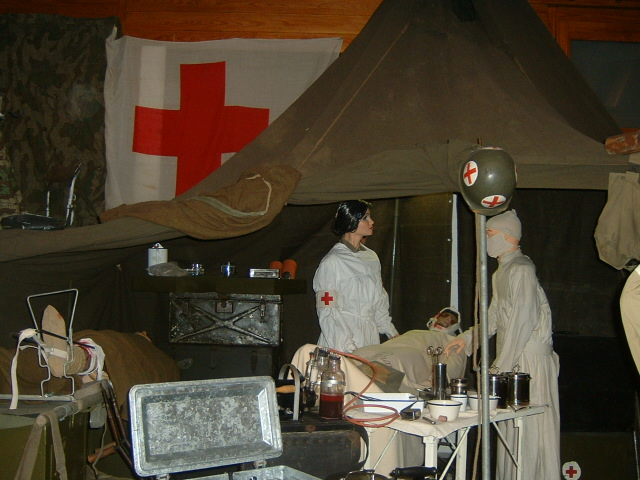
Medical personnel during an armed conflict carry out humanitarian work and are "protected persons" under international humanitarian law. Whether military or civilian, they are considered non-combatants and may not be attacked and not be taken as prisoners of war by parties to a conflict. They use a protective sign such as the red cross, red crescent or red crystal.

Protected persons is a legal term under international humanitarian law and refers to persons who are under specific protection of the 1949 Geneva Conventions, their 1977 Additional Protocols, and customary international humanitarian law during an armed conflict.

The legal definition of different categories of protected persons in armed conflicts is found in each of the 1949 Geneva Conventions and in the 1977 Additional Protocols. The extent of protection and obligations of belligerent states and parties depends on the type of the armed conflict (international or not international) as well as on the category of protected persons in terms of their age (adult/child), sex (man/woman), participation in the armed conflict (combatant/prisoner of war/civil person) and personal situation (e.g. shipwrecked, sick, wounded, etc.).

Minimum rights and fundamental guarantees are granted by the 1977 Additional Protocols I and II to the persons not covered by the 1949 Geneva Conventions, independently of the character of the conflict (international or national). Moreover, the Additional Protocol II extended the protection of existing protected persons in non-international armed conflicts (persons deprived of liberty, wounded and sick, medical and religious personnel, and civilian population).

== History ==
In 1862 Henri Dunant published a book, A Memory of Solferino, describing his experience of the horrors of war during the Battle of Solferino. It increased the desire to improve the conditions of the wounded in armies in the field. Following the diplomatic conference inspired by his ideas and attended by the governments of Europe and several American states, the 1st Geneva Convention was held in 1864 by twelve European countries.

The article 6 of this Convention already stipulated: "Wounded or sick combatants, to whatever nation they may belong, shall be collected and cared for."

This Convention have been replaced by the Geneva Conventions of 1906, 1929 and 1949, based on new elements occurred during the subsequent wars.

== Applicable texts ==
In the area of international humanitarian law (IHL), the four 1949 Geneva Conventions, the 1977 Additional Protocols to them, and customary international humanitarian law are the source of the rights and protections for various categories of persons in the context of international armed conflicts, and also non-international armed conflicts. These texts are focused on protection of victims of armed conflicts and they are based on one general principle: obligation of human treatment of protected persons, without discrimination on the grounds of race, sex, nationality, language, or religion.

The Hague Conventions of 1899 and 1907 are also in force, fully applicable and constitute a part of customary international law. Even before the Geneva Conventions, they already contained a number of important provisions regarding the protection of prisoners of war (forbidden actions) and civil persons (e.g. during the occupation).

In addition, international human rights law also applies to armed conflicts and protects all individuals within the jurisdiction of the state.

== Protected persons associated with the armed forces ==
Definition of military victim is given by the Article 13 of the First Geneva Convention of 1949 and by the Article 4 of the Second Geneva Convention of 1949 for the amelioration of the condition of wounded, sick and shipwrecked members of armed forces at sea. There are several sub-categories of military victims:

- wounded and sick in armed forces in the field;
- wounded, sick and shipwrecked members of armed forces at sea; the status of shipwrecked has a determined duration and can change due to the events in the sea to combatant, interned, prisoner of war (for militaries); to protected person under the Article 4 of the Fourth Geneva Convention (for civilians);
- medical and religious personnel attached to armed forces
- war correspondents.

=== Legal effects ===
There are two types of obligations incumbent to the signatory nations under Article 12 of the 1st Geneva Convention:

- respect, protect and rescue wounded and sick militaries;
- provide treatment and care without any discrimination between them.

In addition to that, the Additional Protocol I to the Geneva Conventions establishes a unitary protection for all sick, wounded and shipwrecked independently of their military or civil status. In return, sick and wounded persons shall refrain from any hostile behaviour to benefit from this protection.

In case of necessity, belligerent powers can appeal to the charity of the civilian population. That being said, the civilian population shall only "respect these wounded and sick, and in particular abstain from offering them violence", but at the same time can not be prosecuted and convicted "for having nursed wounded or sick".

== Prisoners of war ==
Legal definition of prisoners of war is given in the Article 4 of the Third Geneva Convention and apply to the following persons, who "have fallen into the power of the enemy":

- the regular combatants of the adversary (members of the armed forces, levée en masse, militias, members of volunteer corps, resistance movements);
- certain civilians, like civilian members of military aircraft crews; war correspondents; suppliers; members of labour units or services in charge of the welfare of the armed forces;
- medical personnel and chaplains who assist the prisoners of war, shall not be considered as prisoners of war. However, they have right to the protection no less favourable than the protection accorded to the prisoners of war.

Several type of persons has right to the treatment equal to the prisoners of war, without holding this status (parliamentarians, children-combatants). In case of doubt, the concerned person has a right to the presumption of status of prisoner of war, until the exact status is established by the competent court.

=== Persons with special status ===
Four categories of persons need an additional attention:

- a deserter in the hands of the adversary party shall at least be considered as a prisoner of war, but can also obtain another not less favourable status;
- a betrayer in the hands of his Origin State does not have a right to the status of the prisoner of war according to the international dominant practice;
- a spy could be considered as a prisoner of war (combatant in uniform or resident of occupied territory) or not (civil persons or combatant without uniform);
- a mercenary has no right to the status of prisoner of war or combatant, under condition to respect a number of cumulative criteria.

=== Legal effects ===
The Third Geneva Convention describes in a detailed manner the protection granted to prisoners of war and obligations incumbent upon the belligerents:

- Humane treatment – prisoners of war shall be protected against acts of violence, intimidation, insults and public curiosity. They should be housed and receive a sufficient nourishment. Mutilations, medical and scientific experiments, removal of organs for transportation are forbidden. They have rights to quarters, food, clothing, hygiene, medical attention, property, representation, and their badges of rank and nationality.
- Equal treatment – prisoners of war shall be treated without any discrimination on the basis of race, nationality, religion, opinions and similar criteria.
- Security – the prisoners of war shall be evacuated from combat and danger zone. When military considerations permit, their quarters shall be indicated by the letters PW or PG, or another system of marking, clearly visible from the air.
- Labour – prisoners of war could be utilized by the Detaining power for work respecting their age, sex, rank, physical aptitude.
- Proceedings – the Detaining power can prosecute the prisoner of war according to its own laws, regulations and orders in force. During the criminal trial, the prisoner could refuse to cooperate with the Court. Judicial proceedings against the prisoners of war shall be carried in accordance with the fair trial canons. Disciplinary measures shall be adopted rather than judicial wherever it is possible. Even after the conviction, the prisoner keeps his status of the prisoner of war. The death penalty is acceptable by the customary law and the Conventions.
- Repatriation – seriously wounded or sick prisoners of war shall be sent back to their country regardless of number or rank. The rest of prisoners of war shall be released and repatriated after the cessation of active hostilities.

== Civilian persons ==
The term of protected civilian persons is described in the Article 4 of the Fourth Geneva Convention. It does not protect all civilian persons in general, but only those who are "in the hands of" the adverse party during an international armed conflict. In case of doubts, the person is presumed to be a civilian. In other words, civilians under their own national authority and nationals of the countries not party to the Fourth Geneva Convention are not protected by these texts (the latter's limitation is no longer of practical reference, given that the ratification is now universal and the role of the customary international humanitarian law). Neutral persons who are in the belligerent territory and nationals of an ally of a belligerent (co-belligerent) are not protected as long as "their State of nationality maintains normal diplomatic representation with the State in which they find themselves".

Another definition is given by the Article 50 of the Additional Protocol I, but in a negative way – everybody who does not belong to the armed forces or prisoners of war belongs to the civilian population. Thus, persons that were not covered by the Geneva Conventions have minimum protection. In fact, the protection of civilians was extended to the cases of war of national liberation.

The legal effect of the status depends on the category of civilian persons and their location (on the territory of adversary Party or on the occupied territory).

The civilians can lose the protection against the attacks if they participate in hostilities against the enemy.

=== General protection of civilian persons ===
According to the Fourth Geneva Convention, the rights of protected civilian persons are absolute and inalienable. As a consequence,

- parties of armed conflicts cannot conclude special agreements that will "adversely affect the situation of protected persons";
- protected persons cannot renounce to their rights;
- protected persons of occupied or annexed territories cannot be deprived of the rights established in the Geneva Conventions.

Additional Protocol I prohibits indiscriminate attacks or reprisals against civilian persons, their objects, and objects necessary for their survival.

There is a number of basic rights covering the civilian persons:

- Humane treatment – protected persons are "entitled, in all circumstances, to respect for their persons, their honor, their family rights, their religious convictions and practices, and their manners and customs". They shall be protected against acts of violence, intimidation, insults and public curiosity.
- Equal treatment – protection shall be provided without any discrimination on the basis of race, nationality, religion, opinions. Health, rank, sex and age distinction are accepted.
- Security – protected persons cannot be used as human shields. Corporal punishment, torture, murder, collective penalties and experiments are forbidden. Taking of hostages and pillage are prohibited.

In case of non-international armed conflict, Article 3 of the Third Geneva Convention grants basic rights to civilian persons.

=== Civilian persons on the belligerent territory ===
In case the Fourth Geneva Convention is applicable, protected persons can leave the territory, unless it will be contrary to the interests of the belligerent state (i.e. men of fighting age).

Protected person shall have the possibility to appeal against the refusal of permission to leave the territory. The proceedings shall be carried in accordance with the fair trial canons.

Several limitations could be applied to the nationals of adversary party (assigned residence, internment, registration etc.), but they should be able to receive medical assistance, practice their religion, move from danger or military zone and find paid employment.

=== Civilian persons on occupied territories ===
Occupying powers shall respect at least the following rights:

- deportations of protected persons from occupied territory is forbidden, except in case of evacuation for security reasons or for imperative military reasons; if such evacuations arise, they shall be temporary; occupying power shall never transfer its own civilian population to the occupied territory.
- in case of evacuation and transfer the Occupying power shall ensure the humane treatment and security of protected persons;
- forced labour is forbidden;
- destruction of real and personal property is forbidden;
- occupying power shall ensure and maintain food and medical supplies, as well as the medical care to the population of occupied territories.

== Medical, religious and humanitarian personnel ==
Medical personnel benefit from the protection of all four Geneva Conventions. In fact, this category of protected persons implement the protection of protected persons established by international humanitarian law, especially wounded and sick combatants. They should not be attacked, but in contrary respected, kept out of danger and be free to pursue their medical or spiritual duties, unless they are used to commit the acts harmful to the enemy. This protection covers permanent, auxiliary medical personnel, chaplains, staff of National Red Cross Societies and other Voluntary Aid Societies, neutral state society if agreed with Parties to the conflict. Hospitals, medical transport, ships, units, and establishments are also protected and shall bear the distinctive emblems and marks.

Retained permanent personnel is not considered as a prisoners of war, but should benefit from at least the same protection. Auxiliary personnel shall be prisoners of war.

== Women ==
The Geneva Conventions grant special protection to women in all circumstances. Wounded and sick women (members of the army, prisoners of war) shall be treated taking in consideration their sex. During captivity, they should be housed in separated dormitories from men, have separate facilities, and be under supervision of the women. "Women shall be especially protected against any attack on their honour, in particular against rape, enforced prostitution, or any form of indecent assault". Pregnant women, women in childbirth, women who are breast-feeding or who have small children less than 7 years old are considered as sick and wounded.

== Children ==
Several provisions of the Geneva Conventions grant a special protection to the children under fifteen.

Children are protected as victims of armed conflict. They can benefit from special hospital and safety zones in time of peace and the outbreak of hostilities, evacuation from besieged or encircled areas. Necessary measures shall be taken in order to ensure their maintenance, exercise of their religion, and education, if possible by persons of the same nationality, language and religion. They shall benefit from the same preferential treatment as nationals of the enemy.

During detention or internment, they shall be housed separately from adults, unless with their parents and family members. Additional food shall be given taking in consideration their physiological needs.

Children are additionally protected as children-combatants. The parties of the conflict shall take all feasible steps to ensure they do not take direct part in hostilities, including refraining from recruiting them. In case of their participation, children continue to benefit from the special protection. The death penalty shall not be executed on persons under 18 years old at the time of the offence.

== Protection during non-international armed conflicts ==
Increasing number of non-international armed conflicts have been noticed after the Second World War. Theses conflicts are characterized by two factors:

- the parties of the conflict could belong to the same jurisdiction; as a consequence, it is difficult to establish when the civilians are in the hands of the enemy;
- at least one of the parties is composed from the non governmental armed forces.

As a consequence, the main goal of the international humanitarian law is not the protection of civilians, but the protection of all non-participants of the conflict (independently of the nature of the detaining power).

Humane treatment is granted by the common article 3 of the Geneva Conventions. It forbids:

- "violence to life and person (i.e. murder and torture);
- "taking of hostages";
- "outrages upon personal dignity, in particular humiliating and degrading treatment";
- "the passing of sentences and the carrying out of executions without previous judgement pronounced by a regularly constituted court, affording all the judicial guarantees which are recognized as indispensable by civilized peoples".

Additional Protocol II completes article 3 of the Geneva Conventions adds several forbidden actions and grants to protected persons the rights to "respect for their person, honour and convictions and religious practices".

Children continue to benefit from special protection.

Additional Protocol II also prohibits the forced movement of civilians.

== End of armed conflict ==
It becomes more difficult to determine the end of the armed conflict in the modern world, and as a consequence, the application of international humanitarian law in general and to protected persons in particular. Wars today rarely end with a total defeat or by real peace. However, under all circumstances, protected persons remain protected by the minimum guarantees and by international human rights law.

== Sanctions ==
Penal sanctions are foreseen in the Geneva Conventions for persons who committed or ordered to commit grave breaches against protected persons. The grave breaches are qualified as a sub-type of war crimes.
