= Red Lion and Sun Society =

ICRC society of Iran (1929–1980)

- جمعیت شیر و خورشید سرخ ایران
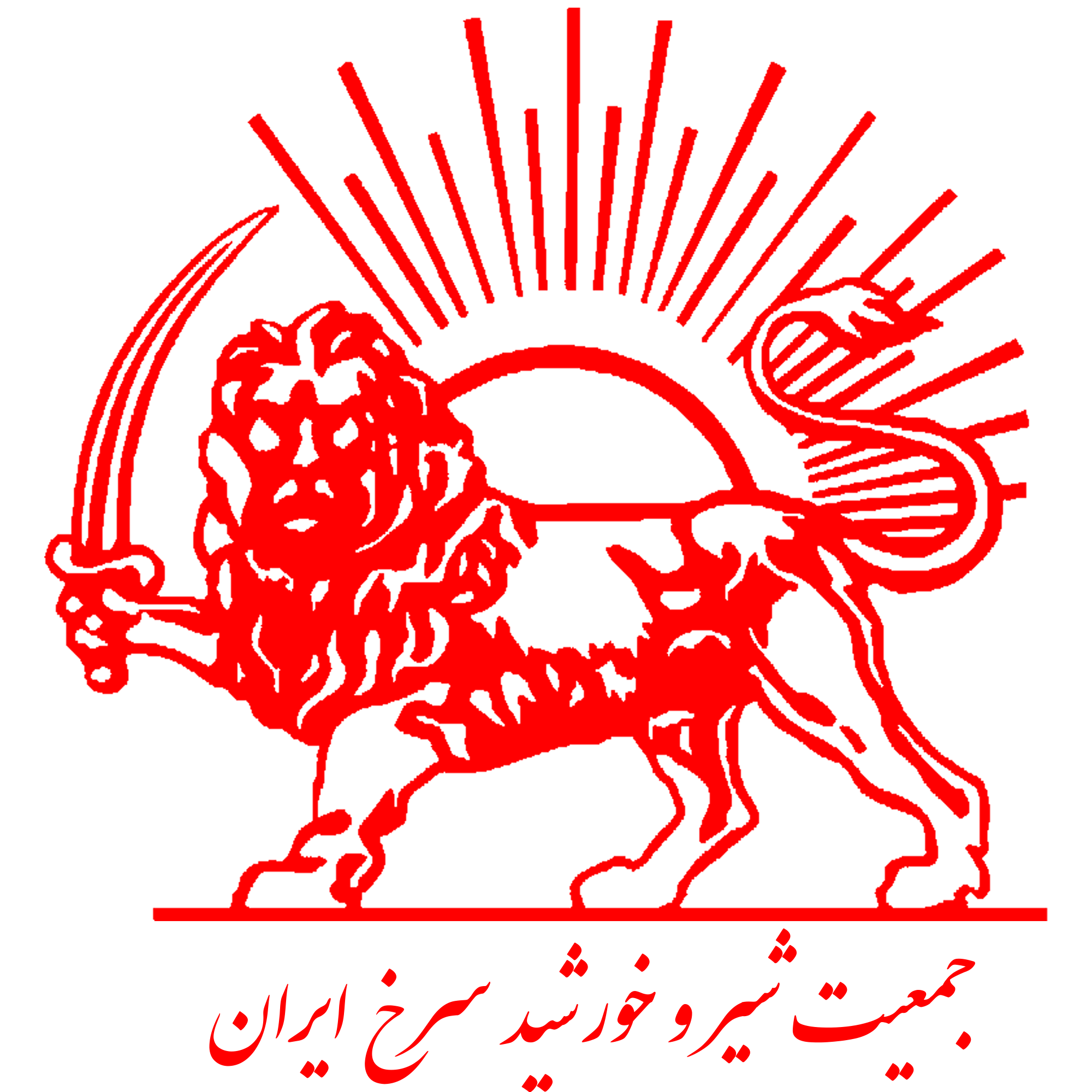
- Emblem

- Flag
- Named after: Lion and Sun
- Successor: Iranian Red Crescent Society
- Formation: 1922; 104 years ago
- Dissolved: 1980; 46 years ago
- Location: Iran
- Affiliations: International Red Cross and Red Crescent Movement

The Red Lion and Sun Society (Persian: جمعیت شیر و خورشید سرخ ایران Jam'iyat Šir o Xoršid Sorx Irân) of Iran was established in 1922 and admitted to the International Red Cross and Red Crescent Movement in 1923. However, some sources report that the symbol was introduced at Geneva in 1864 as a countermeasure to the Red Crescent and the Red Cross used by two of Iran's rivals: the Ottoman Empire and the Russian Empire, respectively.

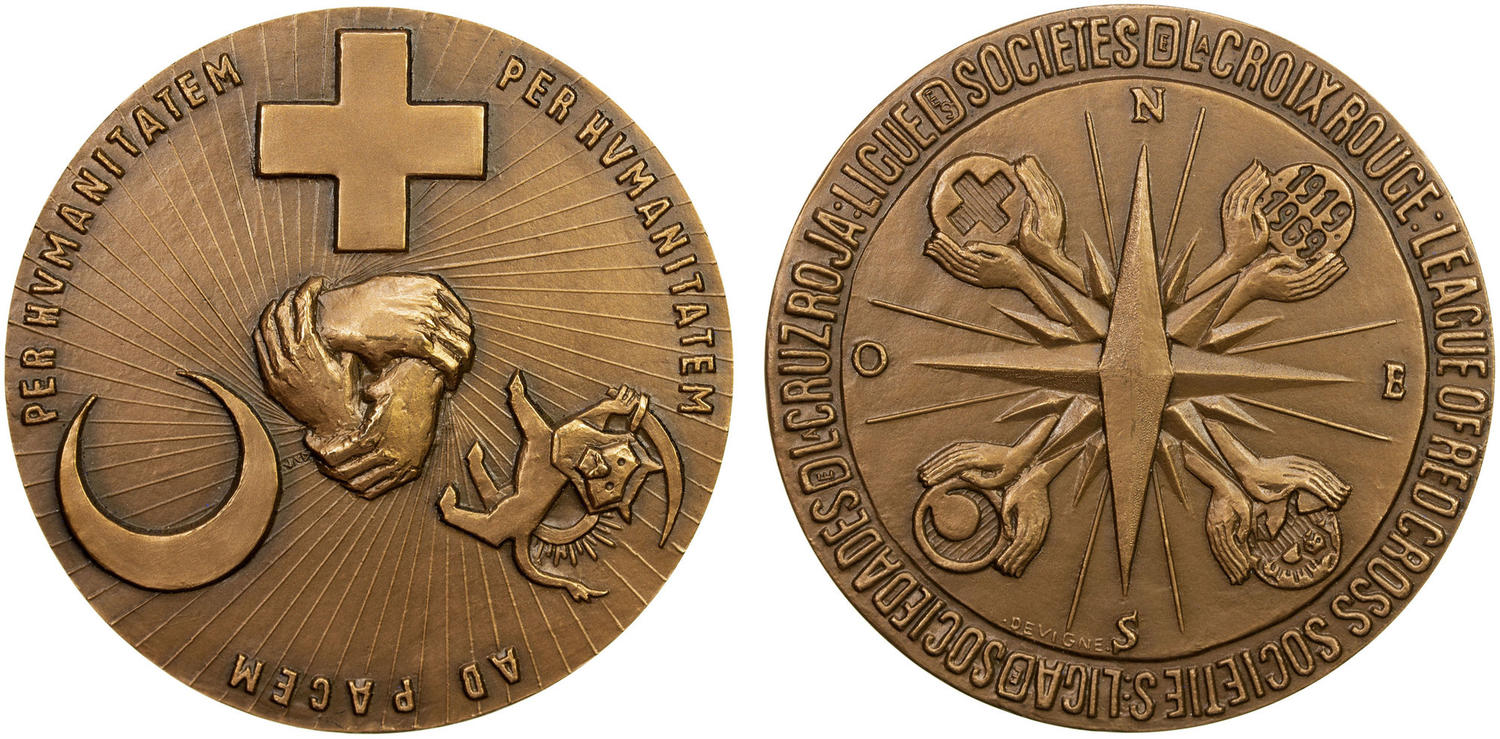
International Red Cross, Red Lion and Sun and Red Crescent medal; Paris mint

In 1980, because of the association of the emblem (Iran's historic Lion and Sun) with the recently deposed Pahlavi dynasty, the newly established Islamic Republic of Iran replaced the Red Lion and Sun with the Iranian Red Crescent Society, adopting the symbol used by most other Muslim-majority countries. Though the Red Lion and Sun has now fallen into disuse, Iran has, in the past, reserved the right to readopt it at any time; the Geneva Conventions continue to recognize it as an official emblem, and that status was confirmed by Protocol III in 2005, even as it added the neutral Red Crystal.

== See also ==
- Order of the Red Lion and the Sun
- Emblems of the International Red Cross and Red Crescent Movement
- Lion and Sun
