= International Red Cross and Red Crescent Museum =

Historical museum in Geneva (Switzerland)

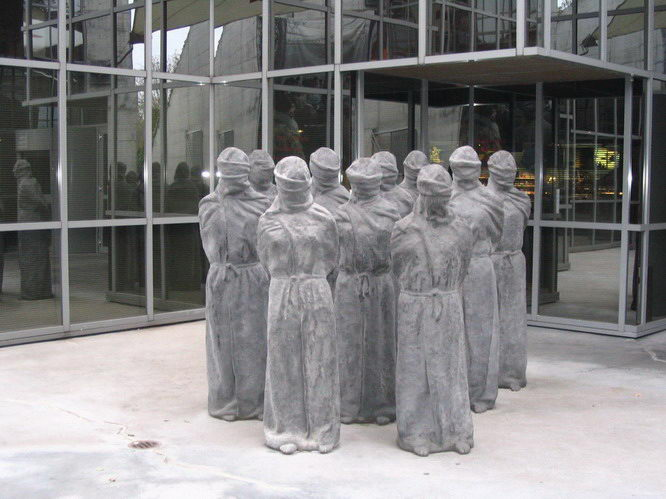
- Established: 1988; 38 years ago
- Location: Avenue de la Paix 17, Geneva, Switzerland
- Coordinates: 46°13′38″N 6°8′13″E
- Type: museum
- Website: https://www.redcrossmuseum.ch/en/

The International Red Cross and Red Crescent Museum is a museum located in Geneva, Switzerland.

== History ==
The museum was opened in 1988 adjacent to the headquarters of the International Committee of the Red Cross. From 1991 to 2024, it was partially funded an annual subsidy from the Swiss foreign ministry of 1.1 million francs ($1.2 million), equivalent to around a quarter of its overall budget. In September 2024, the Swiss government, as part of cost-cutting measures, transferred the subsidization of the museum to the culture ministry, which sparked fears over the museum's operating expenses due to the ministry's policy of forcing museums applying for the subsidy to compete with each other. In July 2025, an agreement was reached in which the culture ministry would subsidize 170,000 francs to the museum annually, while the cantonal government of Geneva and the foreign ministry would each provide 400,000 francs annually.

== Collections ==
The museum contains 30,000 items in its collection, including the first Nobel Peace Prize medal, given jointly in 1901 to Red Cross founder Henry Dunant and French pacifist Frédéric Passy. It also contains the archives of the ICRC's International Prisoners of War Agency, which is included in the Memory of the World Register by UNESCO citing its role in reconnecting people separated during World War I. The museum sees an average of 120,000 visitors annually.

== Gallery ==
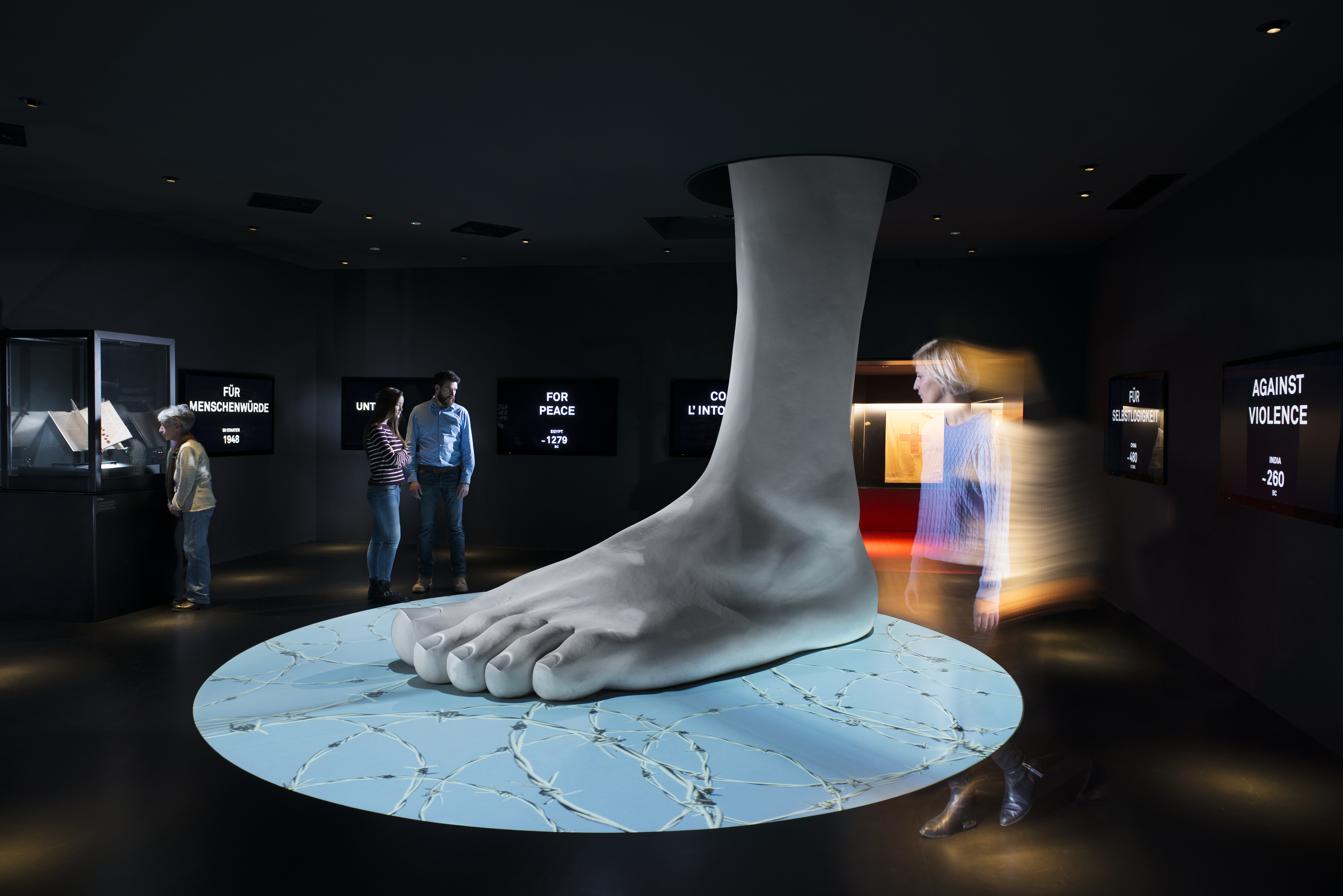

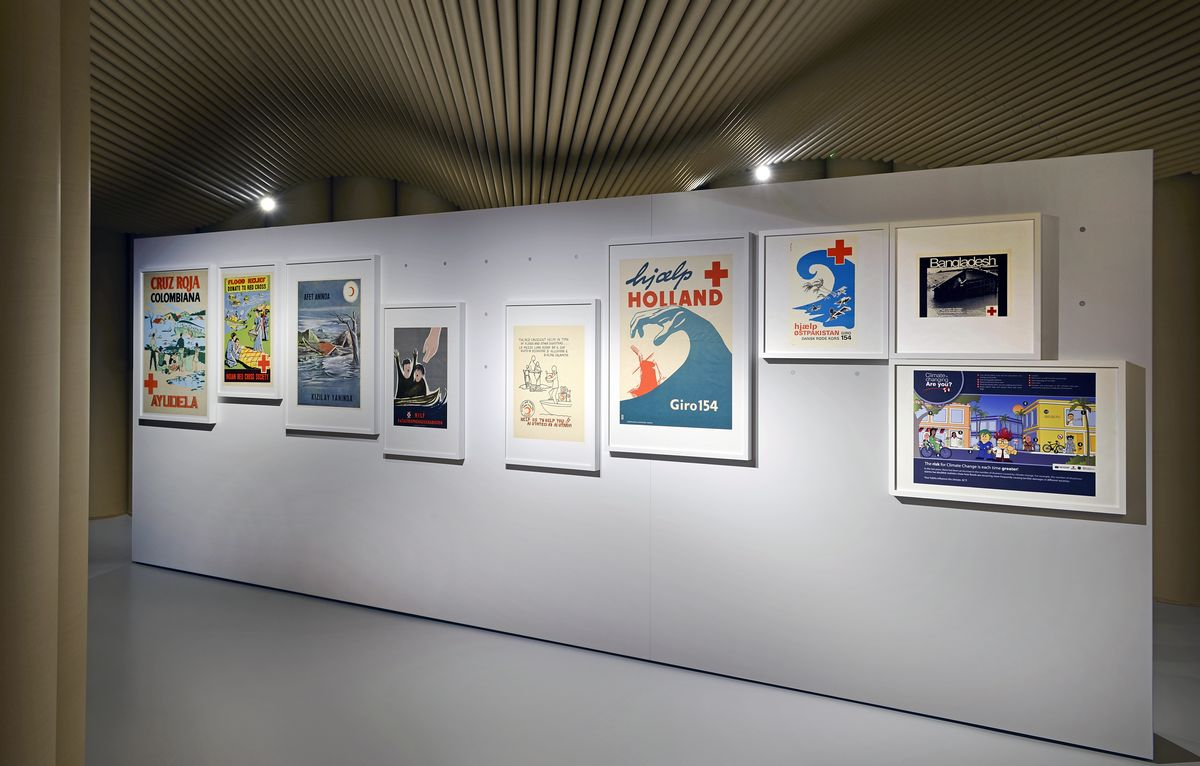

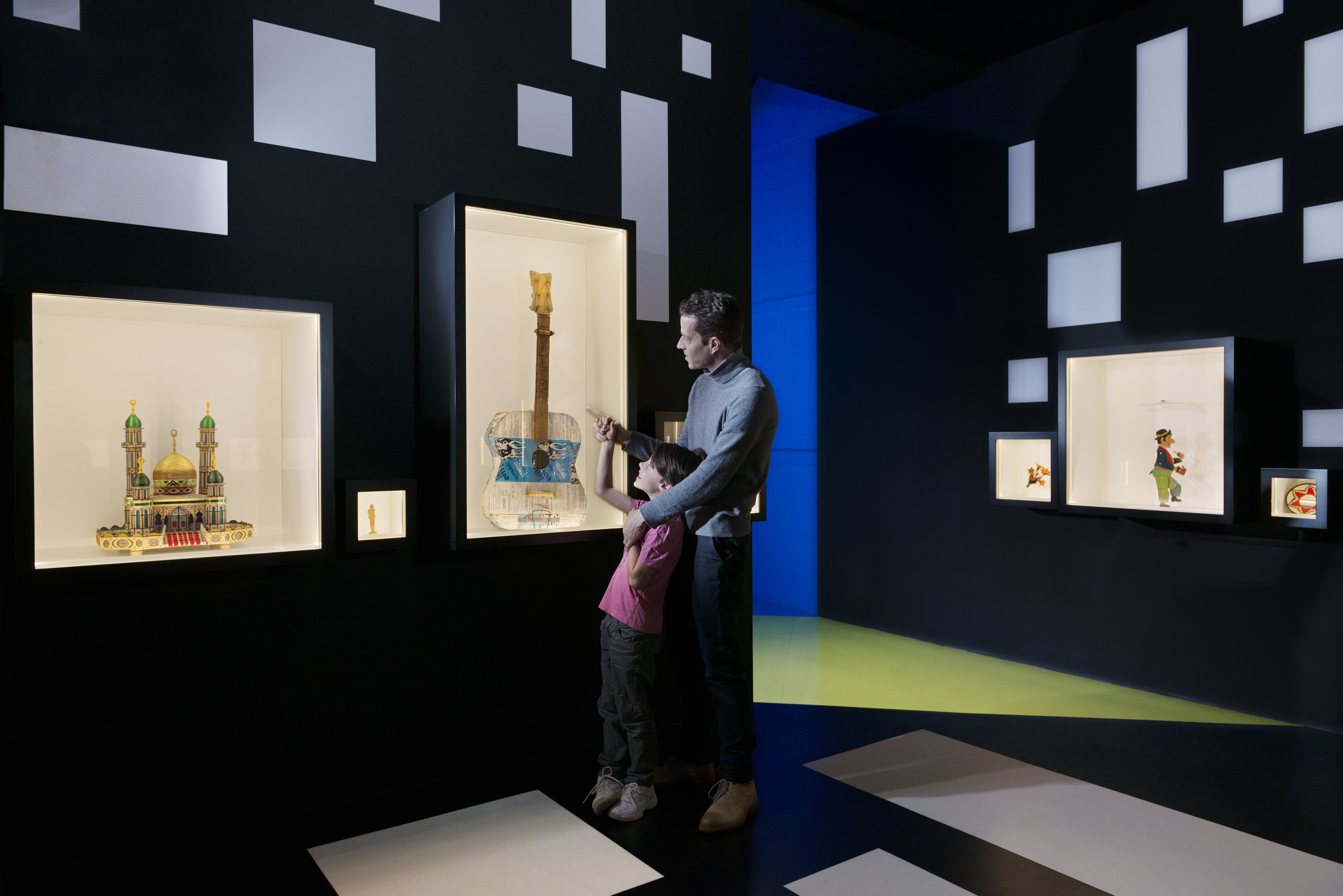

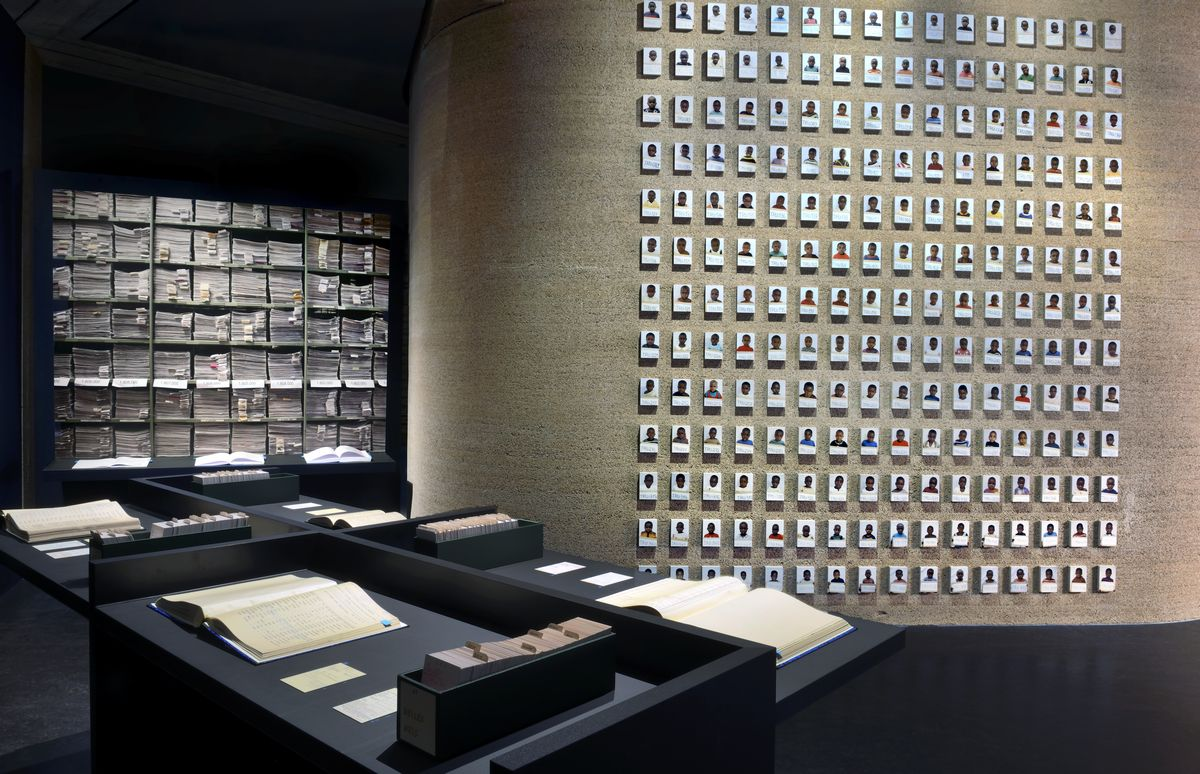

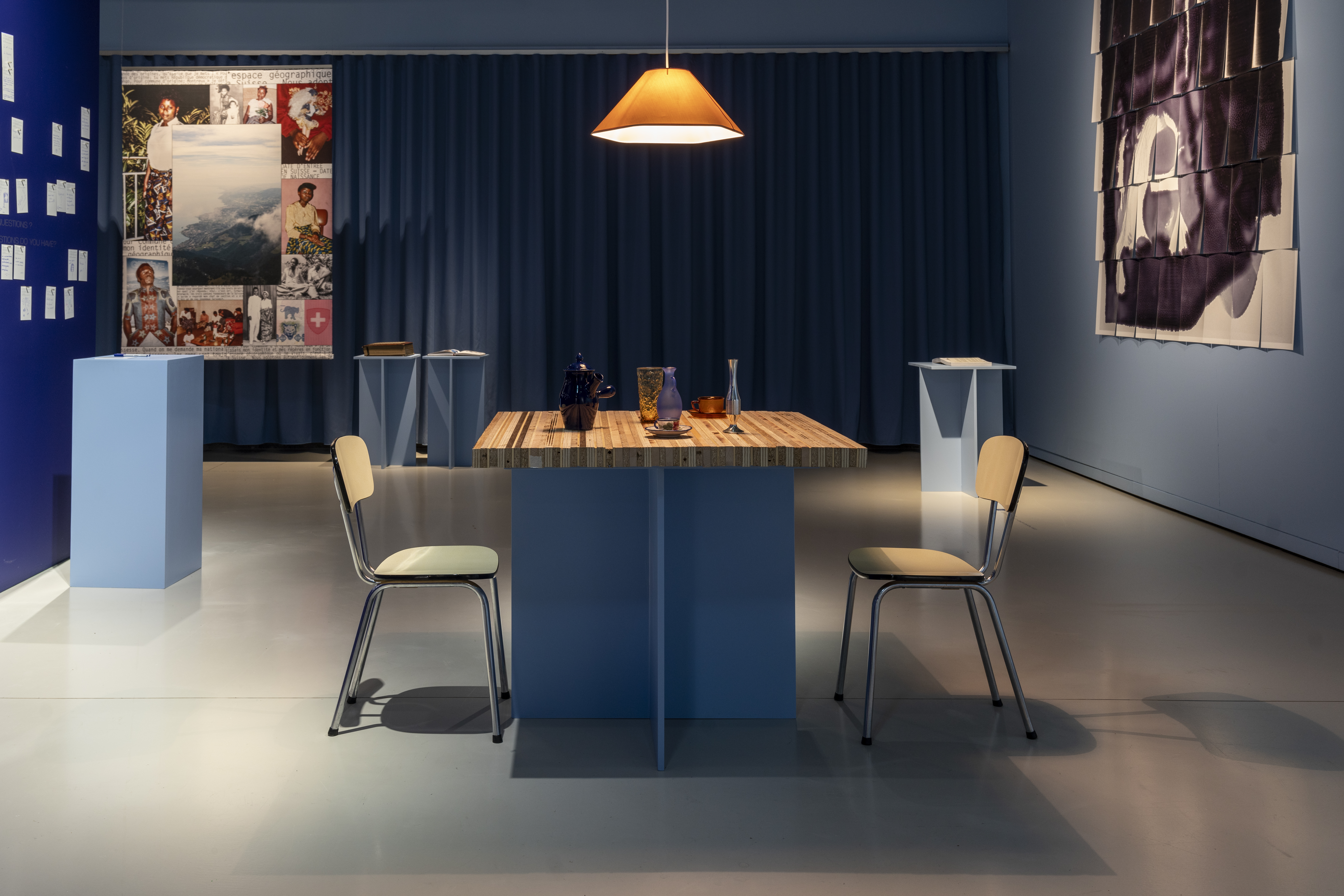

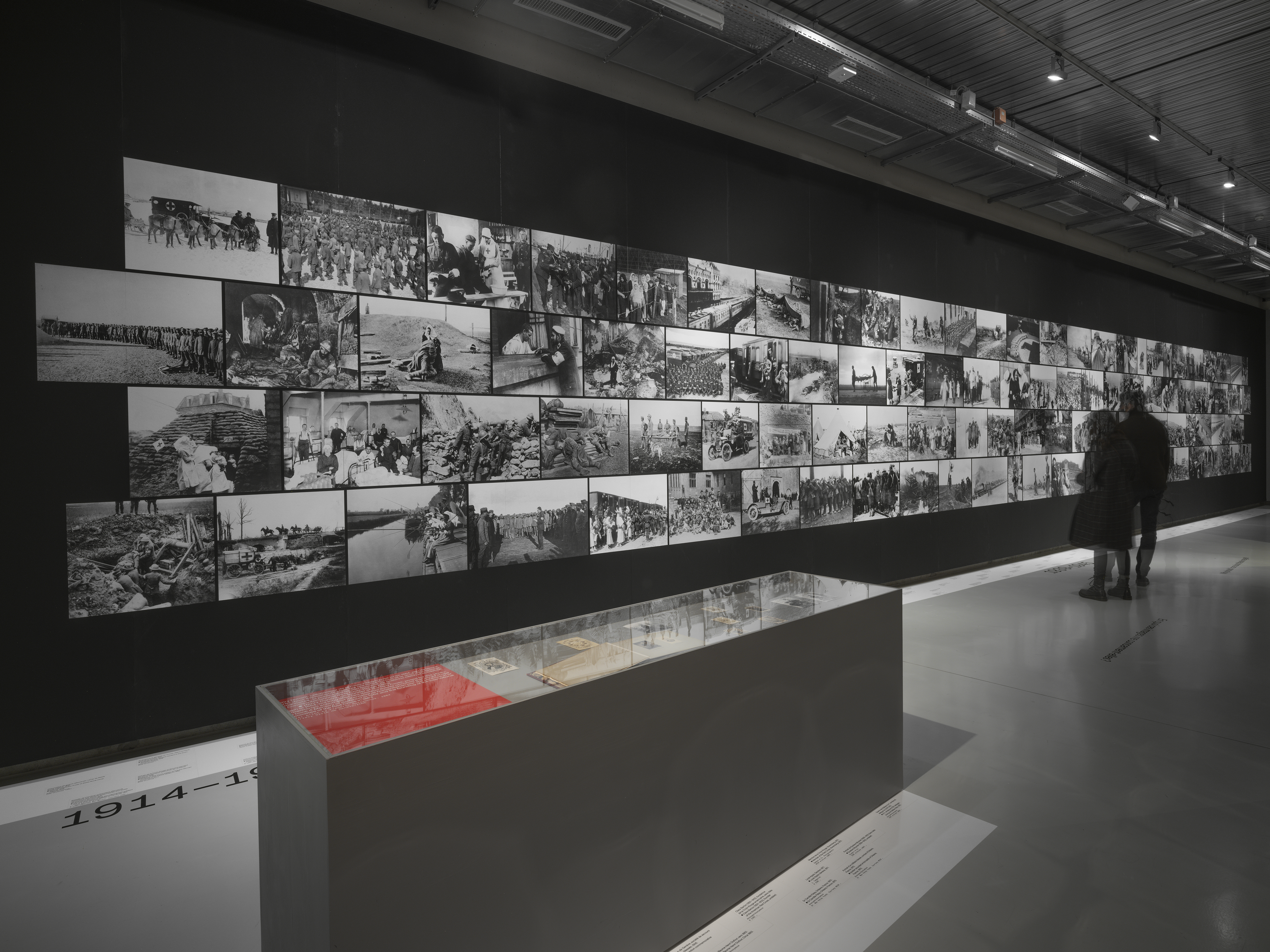

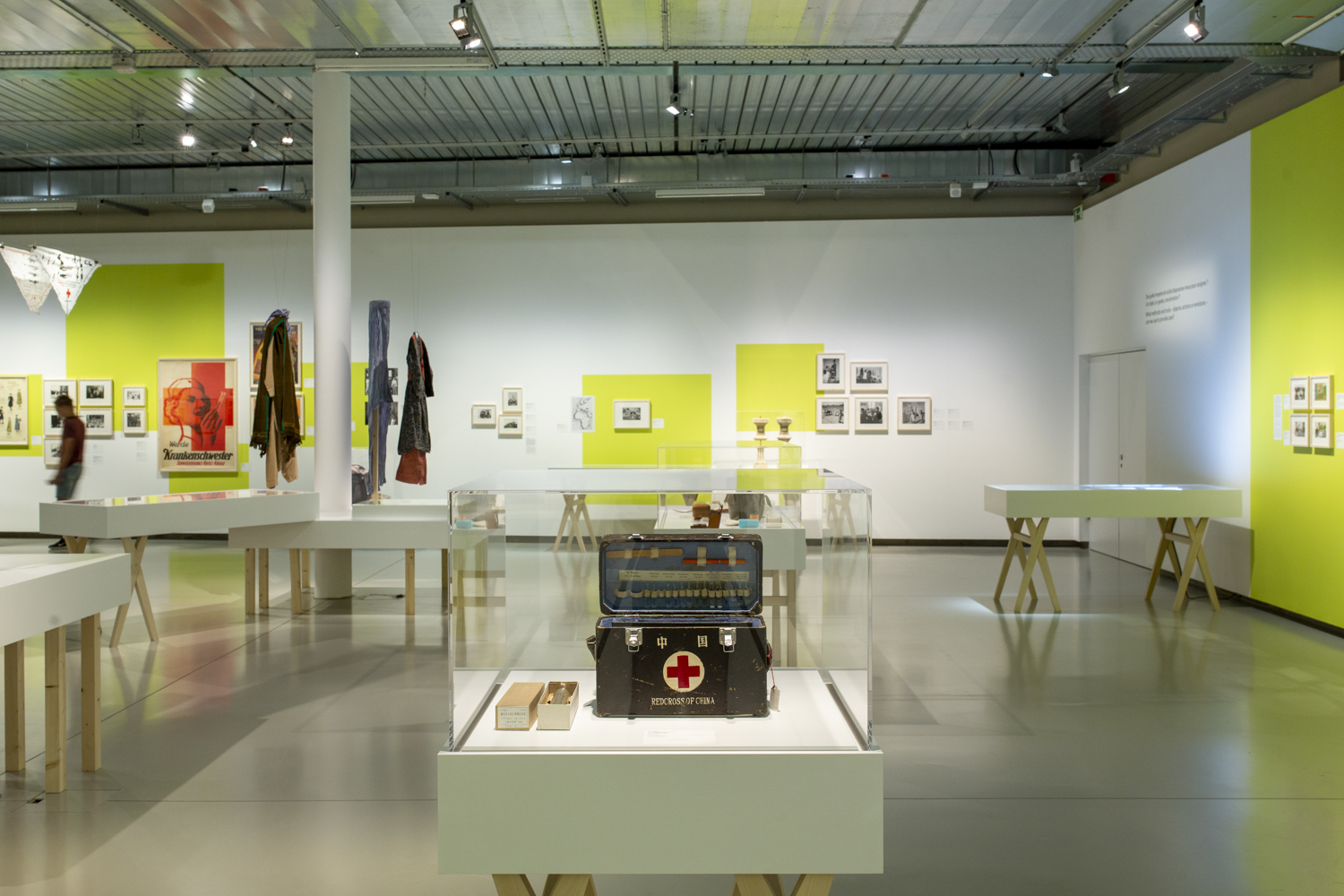

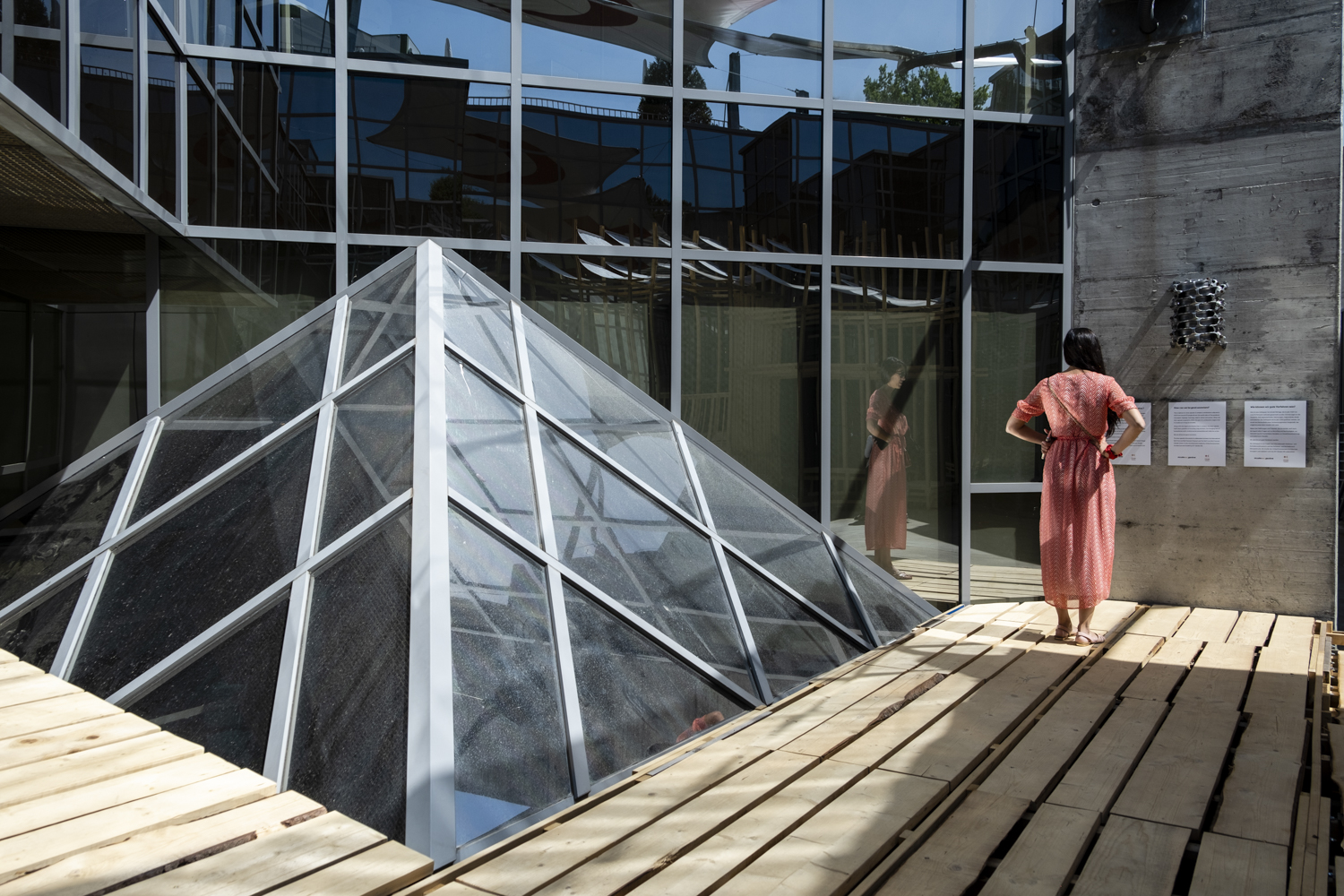

== See also ==
- List of museums in Switzerland
