= World Red Cross and Red Crescent Day =

Annual observance day

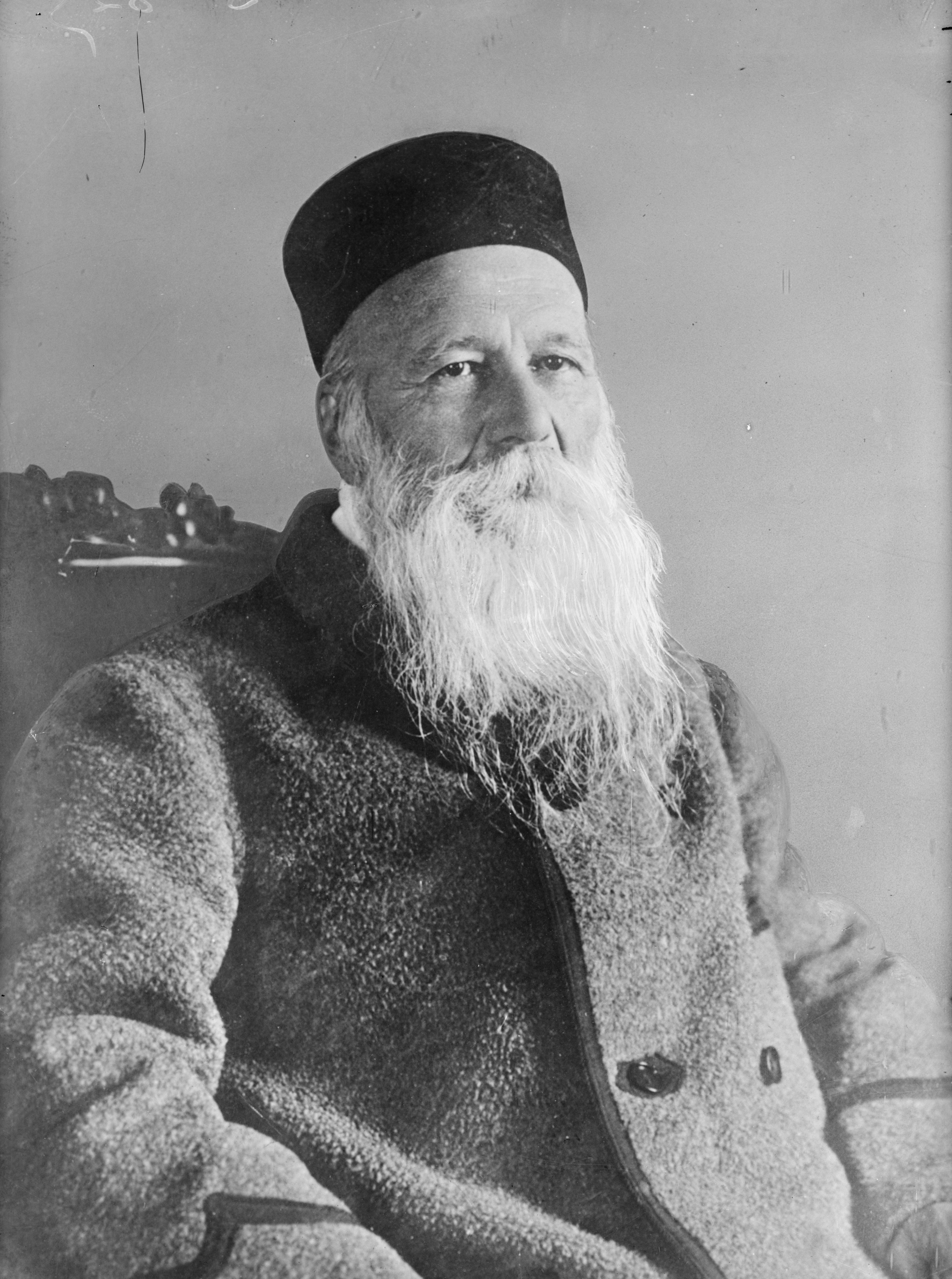
Jean Henri Dunant, founder of the Red Cross

World Red Cross Day and Red Crescent Day is an annual celebration of the principles of the International Red Cross and Red Crescent Movement. World Red Cross Day is also known as Red Crescent Day. World Red Cross Day and Red Crescent Day is celebrated on 8 May every year. This date is the birth anniversary of Henry Dunant, who was born on 8 May 1828 at Geneva, Switzerland, and died on 30 October 1910 at Heiden, Switzerland. He was the founder of (ICRC) International Committee of the Red Cross and the recipient of the first Nobel Peace Prize in 1901.

== History ==
The idea for an "annual action that could take hold in the whole world ... that would be a major contribution to peace" was introduced just after World War I. This initiative, known as the "Red Cross Truce", was studied by an International Commission established at the 14th International Conference of the Red Cross. Its report, presented to the 15th International Conference of the Red Cross in Tokyo in 1934, was approved. It was only after World War II, in 1946, that the Tokyo proposal was studied by the League of Red Cross Societies (LRCS), renamed the International Federation of Red Cross and Red Crescent Societies (IFRC) in 1991. Two years later, having considered the principles of the truce and its applicability across different regions of the world, the proposal of an annual International Red Cross Day was adopted and the first Red Cross Day was celebrated on 8 May 1948. The official title of the day changed over time, and became "World Red Cross and Red Crescent Day" in 1984.

Themes for World Red Cross and Red Crescent Day
Year	Theme
2009	Change in the Climate and it causes on the Human's which serves as a Today's Solferino
2010	City
2011	Search for the Volunteer which is inside you
2012	Move of the Youth
2013	Be Together for the reason of Humanity
2014	Get Together for everyone people
2015	Together for Humanity
2016	Everywhere for Every People
2017	Less Known Red Cross Stories
2018	Memorable smiles from around the world
2019	#Love
2020	#Keepclapping
2021	#Unstoppable
2022	#BeHumankind
2023	#Fromtheheart
2024	Keeping humanity alive
2026	United in humanity
