= Protective sign =

Symbols used to mark humanitarian actors

Protective signs are legally protected symbols to be used during an armed conflict to mark persons and objects under the protection of various treaties of international humanitarian law. While their essential meaning can be summarized as "don't shoot" or "don't attack", the exact conditions implied vary depending on the respective sign and the circumstances of its use. The form, shape and color of these signs are defined by the rules of international humanitarian law. Usually, they are easy to draw in order to make even an improvised use as easy as possible, and they were chosen to be as concise, recognizable and visible as possible under all circumstances.

The misuse of protective signs is a violation of international humanitarian law and punishable under the national law of all countries who are state parties to the respective treaties. Using protective signs in order to injure, kill, or capture the enemy (perfidy) is a war crime.

== List of protective signs ==
The following signs have a protective meaning under certain conditions:

- the Red Cross as well as the equivalent signs of the Red Crescent and Red Crystal, to be used to mark all persons and objects under the protection of the four Geneva Conventions of 1949 and their additional protocols of 1977
- a blue triangle on orange ground as the international distinctive sign of civil defense; to be used to mark the personnel and objects of civil defense organizations
- the letters "PG" or "PW" to mark a prisoner of war camp and the letters "IC" to mark an internment camp for civilians
- an oblique red band on a white ground to mark hospitals and safety zones
- the white flag; used to designate unarmed parliamentaries (negotiators, along with their flag bearer and optional drummer) asking for a truce or ceasefire, or to symbolise surrender
- the emblem of the United Nations as well as the letters "UN"; to be used to mark the personnel and materiel of UN Peacekeeping missions
- the distinctive mark of the Roerich Pact for the identification of historic monuments, museums, scientific, artistic, educational and cultural institutions (such as universities, theatres, and ancient monuments)
- the distinctive marking of cultural property, to be used to mark "movable or immovable property of great importance to the cultural heritage of every people"; and the triple use of that sign to mark cultural property under special protection, including "refuges intended to shelter movable cultural property" (e.g. paintings, sculptures and texts) and "immovable cultural property of very great importance" (such as the Royal Observatory or the Taj Mahal)
- the special sign used to facilitate the identification of "works and installations containing dangerous forces" (dams, dikes and nuclear electrical generating stations), consisting of three bright orange circles placed on the same axis
Red Cross

Red Crescent

Red Crystal

International distinctive sign of civil defense

Marking for hospitals and safety zones

White flag

Flag of the United Nations

Distinctive flag for monuments and cultural institutions (now superseded)

Distinctive marking of cultural property

Distinctive marking of cultural property under special protection

Special sign for works and installations containing dangerous forces

Of these symbols, the distinctive flag of the Roerich Pact was superseded by the distinctive marking of cultural property as defined by the Hague Convention of 1954. As all countries bound by the Washington Treaty of 1935 have ratified the convention of 1954, it is effectively out of use.

== See also ==
- Geneva Conventions
- Hague Conventions
- Rule of Law in Armed Conflicts Project (RULAC)
