= Ruslan (ship) =

Ship in the Third Aliya, considered the "Mayflower" of Israeli culture

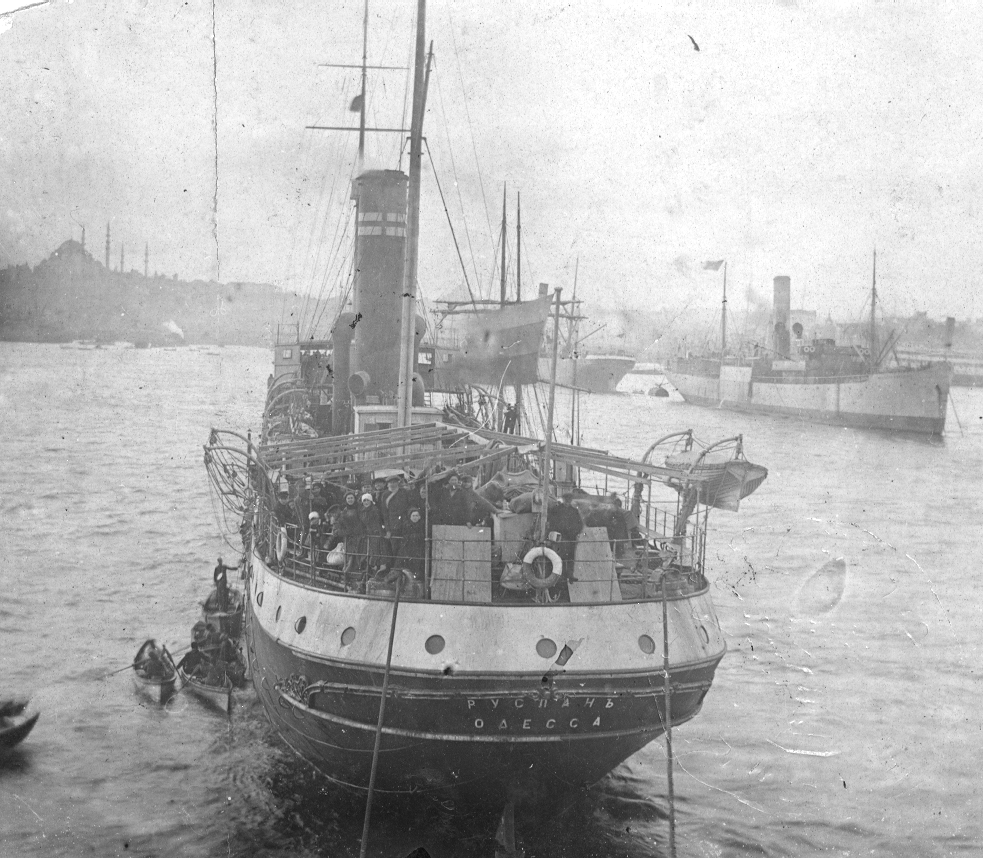
The Ruslan, whilst passing Istanbul

Ruslan (in archaic Russian spelling: Русланъ; in today's accepted spelling: Руслан) which bore the name of the Russian hero Ruslan from Pushkin's poem Ruslan and Ludmila was the first officially organized ship that sailed from the former Russian Empire to Palestine in 1919, after the end of the First World War. On board were 671 passengers, many of whom would become pioneers in Israeli culture, which is why the Ruslan is nicknamed the "Mayflower" of Israel.

Ruslan is considered the first ship to open the Third Aliya period, referring to the third migration of European Jews to Palestine. Despite this, it was one of the last ships to arrive at the shores of Jaffa that year.

== Background ==
In 1918, several hundred residents of Safed and Jaffa arrived who wandered through Syria and Turkey until they arrived in the port of Odessa, while the Austro-Hungarian army was there, hoping that as Austrian subjects they would be allowed to reach Austria. Their attempt failed and they had to stay in Odessa, suffering from cold and rain. To their aid, young Jews - members of the organizations "Revival", "Zion Youth" and others - greatly supported them. They transferred them from the port to the barracks of the Austrian army, which had been abandoned in the meantime. Despite this assistance, several of the refugees died.

The Odessan youngsters, leaders of these Zionist movements, helped the refugees establish the "Refugee Committee of the Land of Israel" which asked to head to Palestine at the end of the war. At that time, numerous European Jews who wanted to immigrate to Palestine gathered in Odessa. The leaders of the organizations decided to take advantage of the existence of a group of several dozen refugees who wanted to passage and exaggerated the number of refugees to allow immigrants to join the group of refugees. Menachem Ussishkin and Meir Dizengoff contacted the British Foreign Minister, Lord Curzon, and convinced him that they were not Bolsheviks. Organizing the immigrants was a complicated operation. At the time, Russia was in the midst of the Russian Civil War, and control of key provinces and government institutions changed rapidly between the Bolsheviks and the opposing forces. Amongst the organizers was also Joseph Klausner, who assisted the Odessan Jewish intelligentsia.

== Legacy ==
Several of the ship's passengers became important in Israeli culture when the State of Israel was founded in 1948, including historian Joseph Klausner, Zeev Rechter, Yehuda Magidovitch, the Ecole de Paris artist Isaac Frenkel Frenel, Moshe Frenkel, and the cartoonist Arieh Navon.

Due to the cultural importance and pioneering spirit of the passengers, the Ruslan has been dubbed "the Mayflower of Israel." Its passengers pioneered and transformed Israel in the arts and architecture. In 2019, the Israel Museum hosted an exhibition commemorating the Ruslan and its passengers.
