= Eli Beer =

Israeli activist (born 1973)

- אלי ביר
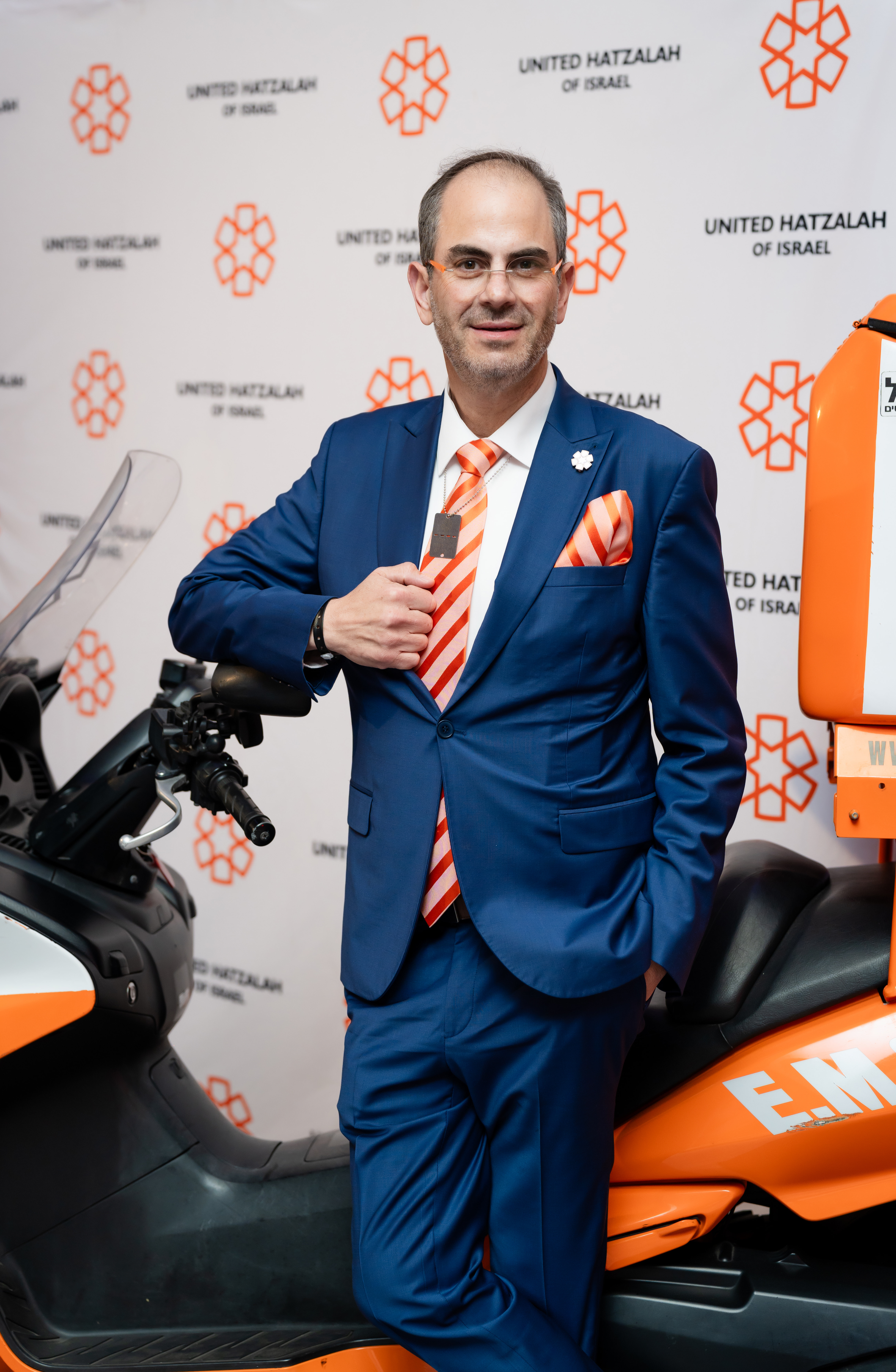
- Beer in 2024
- Born: 13 September 1973 (age 52); Israel
- Known for: Founder of United Hatzalah

Eli Beer (Hebrew: אלי ביר; born September 13, 1973) is an Israeli social entrepreneur and emergency medical services innovator, best known as the founder of United Hatzalah of Israel, the world’s largest fully volunteer emergency medical services (EMS) organization. United Hatzalah of Israel is an independent, non-profit, fully-volunteer emergency medical services organization that provides fast and free emergency medical first response throughout Israel.

== Biography ==
Beer was born in Jerusalem on September 13, 1973. His interest in emergency medical response began at just age seven, when he witnessed the bombing of the #12 bus on June 2, 1978 near his home, an event he has described as leaving a profound impact on him and motivating his desire to help people in medical distress. He began volunteering on an ambulance at age 15 while still attending school and helping in his family’s bookstore and real-estate business.

Beer later founded United Hatzalah of Israel, an independent, volunteer-based emergency medical services organization that pioneered the use of GPS-based dispatching and ambucycles to reduce response times. The organization grew nationwide and internationally, and Beer also became president of the U.S.-based Friends of United Hatzalah. In March 2020, while on a fundraising trip to the United States, Beer contracted COVID-19 and was hospitalized in serious condition at the University of Miami Hospital. His condition deteriorated and he was placed on a ventilator in a medically induced coma for several weeks. He eventually woke from the coma, was removed from the ventilator, and began his recovery before returning to Israel.

== Organizational career ==
=== Hatzalah Jerusalem ===
Beer began to work with Hatzalah Jerusalem in 1992. With him as fundraiser and operational coordinator the organization grew and changed its name to Hatzalah Israel, reflecting its nationwide scope. Hatzalah Israel acted as an umbrella organization, incorporating many Hatzalah chapters that had been established throughout the country.

In 2002, following a terror attack in the Beit Yisroel neighborhood of Jerusalem where first response was slowed by the narrow roadways and congestion created by the panic in the neighborhood, a volunteer from the organization came up with the idea of having first responders arrive with a full complement of medical equipment on motorcycles in order to cut through traffic and arrive at the scenes of medical emergencies faster. This gave birth to the 'ambucycle' a term coined by the organization to fit the newly created ambulance-motorcycle. Inside each of these vehicles is a full complement of medical equipment carried by a regular ambulance with the exception of a backboard, stair-chair, and bed.

=== United Hatzalah ===
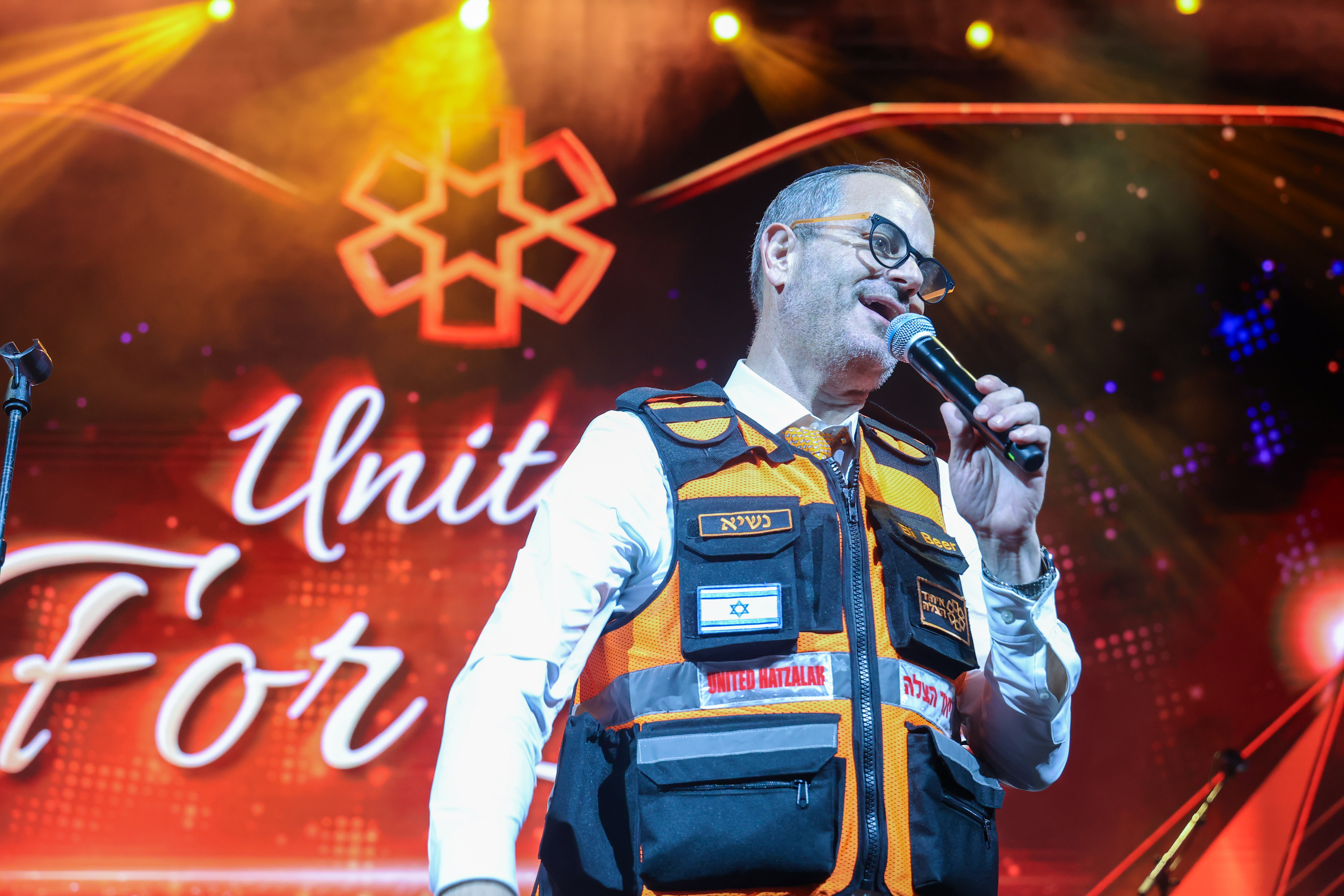
Eli Beer at 2024 United Hatzalah concert

Following the Second Lebanon War in 2006, Beer unified numerous smaller Hatzalah organizations from around the country and changed the name of the organization to United Hatzalah to represent the newly unified organization divided into branches and the partnership of Jewish, Muslim, Druze, and Christian volunteers from all religious spectrums working together in order to save lives.

United Hatzalah established its reputation as an EMS organization by being at the forefront of medical innovation. It was the first EMS to introduce the Ambucycle, which allowed its volunteer first responders to reach the patient on average of 3 minutes across Israel, 8 to 15 minutes ahead of the first ambulance. In 2008, United Hatzalah launched Israel's first GPS-based dispatch system, which was able to locate and dispatch the five closest EMS responders within 3 seconds of the emergency.

The organization has grown to include more than 8,000 volunteer medical first responders including EMTs, paramedics, and doctors, who responded to more than 700,000 medical emergencies in 2024. All services are provided free of charge to all people regardless of race, nationality, or religion.

Beer's vision is to bring United Hatzalah's life-saving model to other communities across the world. In 2015, he expanded internationally with the establishment of branches in South America, and other countries, including United Rescue in Jersey City, New Jersey in the United States, where the response time was reduced to just two minutes and thirty-five seconds as a result.

During his voluntary career as an EMT, Beer has been a medical responder at the scenes of the Ben Yehuda Street bombings, the Versailles Wedding Hall disaster, the Second Lebanon War in the north, and Operation Cast Lead in the south as well as dozens of other major terror attacks and mass casualty incidents.

==== October 7 response ====
During the Gaza war, Beer played a pivotal role in providing critical humanitarian assistance and medical care to those affected by the conflict. Setting up United Hatzalah field hospital and dispatch, Beer helped send over 1,500 volunteer EMTs to the Gaza periphery to treat both civilian and military personnel wounded in the Hamas terror attacks. Beer helped mobilize tens of thousands of donors worldwide to raise funds for critical medical supplies, such supplies were depleted due to the massive humanitarian response United Hatzalah provided to wounded people in Israel. Beer met with U. S. President Joe Biden on his visit to Israel, to show support for the organization, the first responder community, and the nation of Israel during its time of peril.

During a donors conference by the Republican Jewish Coalitions’ Annual Leadership Summit in Las Vegas on 28 October 2023, Beer disseminated the story of an Israeli baby being placed in an oven and burned to death, but this was unable to be verified.

Beer was featured on a number of interviews accounting details of United Hatzalah volunteers' response on October 7, most notably on Fox News with Jake Tapper as well as CNN, CBS News and other major media outlets.

== Personal life ==
Eli Beer is married to Gitty Beer, who also volunteers with United Hatzalah and has been instrumental in founding its women's unit. Together they have five children. Several of their children and their spouses are active volunteers with United Hatzalah as well, reflecting the family’s deep involvement in emergency medical response. They reside in Jerusalem.

== Awards and recognition ==
- Social Entrepreneur of the Year, Israel (2010) - Beer received the Social Entrepreneur Award from the Schwab Foundation for Social Entrepreneurship in cooperation with the World Economic Forum of Davos in 2010. The award is given to those driving social innovation and transformation in various fields including education, health, environment and enterprise development.
- Presidential Award for Volunteerism, Israel (2011) - Beer received the Presidential Award for Volunteerism from Shimon Peres, the President of the State of Israel in 2011. The award is given to individuals and groups whose volunteering effort is deemed to be outstanding in a given year by a committee. Twelve awardees are chosen each year.
- Young Global Leader, Davos (2012) - Nominated by a committee chaired by Queen Rania of Jordan for his efforts to create a multicultural, apolitical medical rescue organization, Beer was chosen to become one of the World Economic Forum's Young Global Leaders in 2012. Young Global Leaders come from 65 countries and are honored for their outstanding leadership, professional accomplishments and commitment to society.
- The Victor J. Goldberg IIE Prize for Peace in the Middle East (2013) - The Institute of International Education (IIE) awards the Victor J. Goldberg IIE Prize for Peace in the Middle East annually to recognize outstanding work being conducted jointly by two individuals, one Arab and one Israeli, working together to advance the cause of peace in the Middle East. Beer received the prize together with Murad Alian, the Coordinator of United Hatzalah's Team in Israeli-occupied East Jerusalem .
- World Values Network, Champion of Human Life Award (2016) - Beer received the Champion of Human Life Award at the Fourth Annual Champions of Jewish Values International Awards Gala, sponsored by the World Values Network, a platform established by Rabbi Shmuley Boteach, recognizing those who strive to positively affect society.
- Conference of European Rabbis, Internet Entrepreneur Prize (2017) - The CER Prize is awarded to digital and web-based ventures that have potential to change the world and improve lives. Beer was awarded the CER Internet Entrepreneur Prize in Helsinki, for developing United Hatzalah's LifeCompass app, which automatically dispatches the five closest EMT responders within three seconds of an emergency.
- Ted talks - Beer was invited to be a speaker in April 2013 on TEDMED, his talk was later featured on the TED website. He also spoke at the TEDx Gateway conference in India in February 2020.
- 50 Most Influential Jews List - In October 2024, Beer was selected as one the Jerusalem Post's 50 most influential Jews for United Hatzalah's lifesaving response to October 7th and United Hatzalah's innovations, including the ambucycle and GPS based dispatch .
- United Hatzalah was awarded the 2024 Health Minister’s Shield for Volunteering in recognition of its lifesaving efforts during the October 7th attacks, the Iron Swords War, and its ongoing contribution to public health in Israel.
