= United Hatzalah =

Volunteer-based emergency medical services

United Hatzalah of Israel
- Formation: 2006
- Type: Free, volunteer-based emergency medical services
- Legal status: Non-governmental non-profit organization
- Purpose: Humanitarian
- Headquarters: Jerusalem
- Region served: Israel, worldwide
- Official language: Hebrew
- President/founder: Eli Beer
- Budget: US$20 million (2018)
- Volunteers: 8000
- Website: 1221.org.il
- Remarks: Awarded 2011 Israeli Presidential Award for Volunteerism

United Hatzalah (Hebrew: איחוד הצלה, lit. 'rescue union') is an Israeli volunteer-based emergency medical services (EMS) organization providing free service throughout Israel, with its headquarters based in Jerusalem. Its mission is to provide immediate medical intervention during the critical window between the onset of an emergency and the arrival of traditional ambulance assistance. It is one of many hatzalah organizations in various parts of the world and the only one that includes women and non-Jewish volunteers.

United Hatzalah of Israel was founded in 2006 with the merger of several small local hatzalah organizations. It has grown to become the largest independent, non-profit, fully volunteer EMS organization in the world, with over 8,000 volunteer medical first responders nationwide, and additional chapters in Panama and Ukraine. The organization provides free services to all citizens regardless of race, religion, or national origin. With the help of its Uber-like GPS dispatch system and a fleet of rapid response ambucycles, United Hatzalah has achieved an average response time of less than 3 minutes nationwide and 90 seconds in metropolitan areas.

United Hatzalah's national command center in Jerusalem uses an advanced GPS-based dispatch technology to identify the closest and most qualified volunteers and routes them to the scene of an emergency through a mobile device application. Approximately 1,000 volunteers are outfitted with medically equipped motorcycles, “ambucycles” capable of navigating around traffic jams to reach victims in as few as 90 seconds. The remaining volunteers respond to emergencies using their own private cars, or organizational emergency ambucars, e-bikes, ambuboats, or ATVs, depending upon the location of the emergency. In 2025, United Hatzalah launched the ambuscooter, a fully medically equipped electric scooter designed to maneuver through heavy traffic and narrow streets. The organization is funded exclusively through private charitable support.

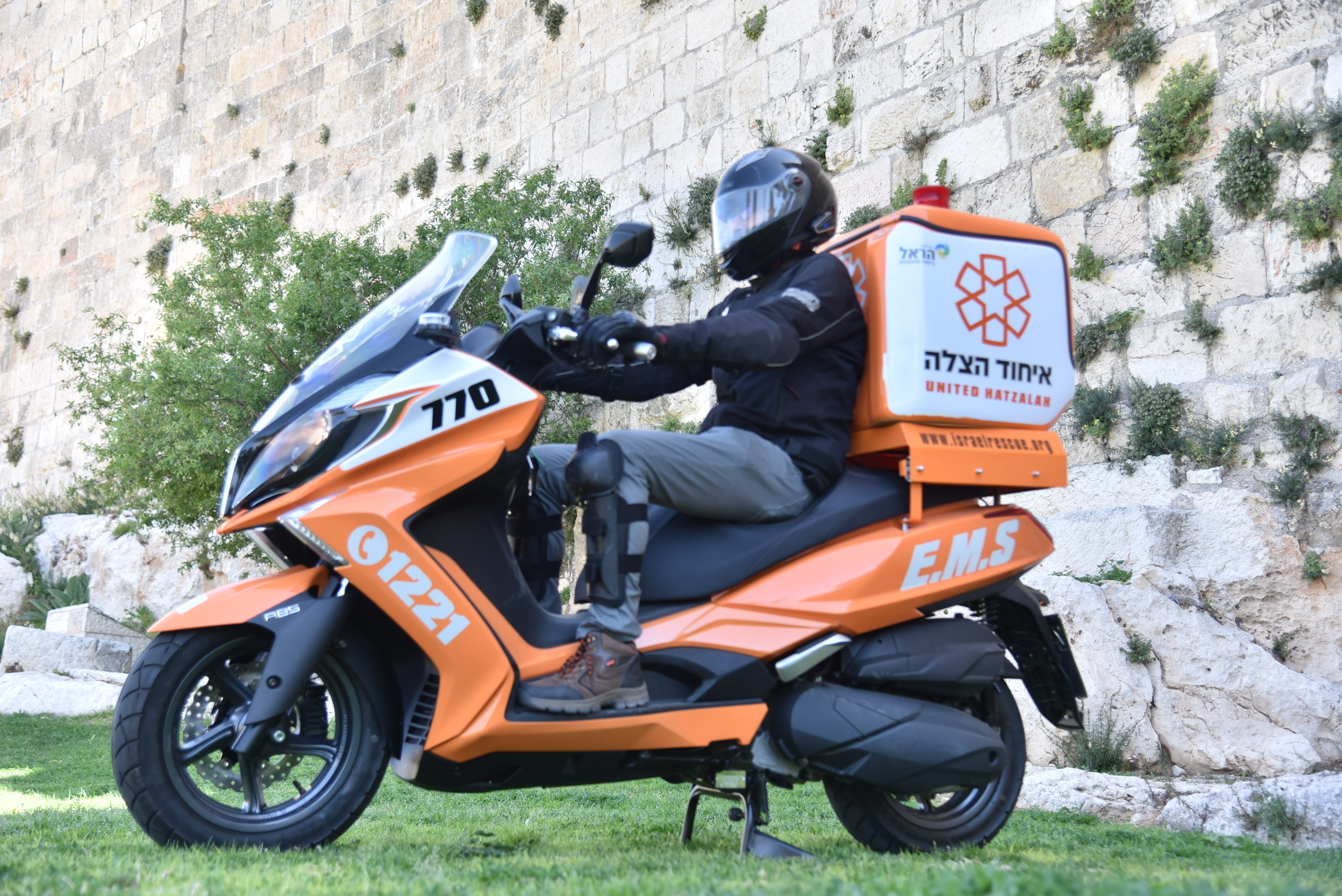
“Ambucycle” of United Hatzalah of Israel

Within Israel, individuals may contact United Hatzalah through its direct number, 1221; however, some dispatch information is received directly from national ambulance services. United Hatzalah in turn alerts and coordinates with local ambulances, Search and Rescue (SAR), fire, and police services, and the IDF, when necessary.

== History ==
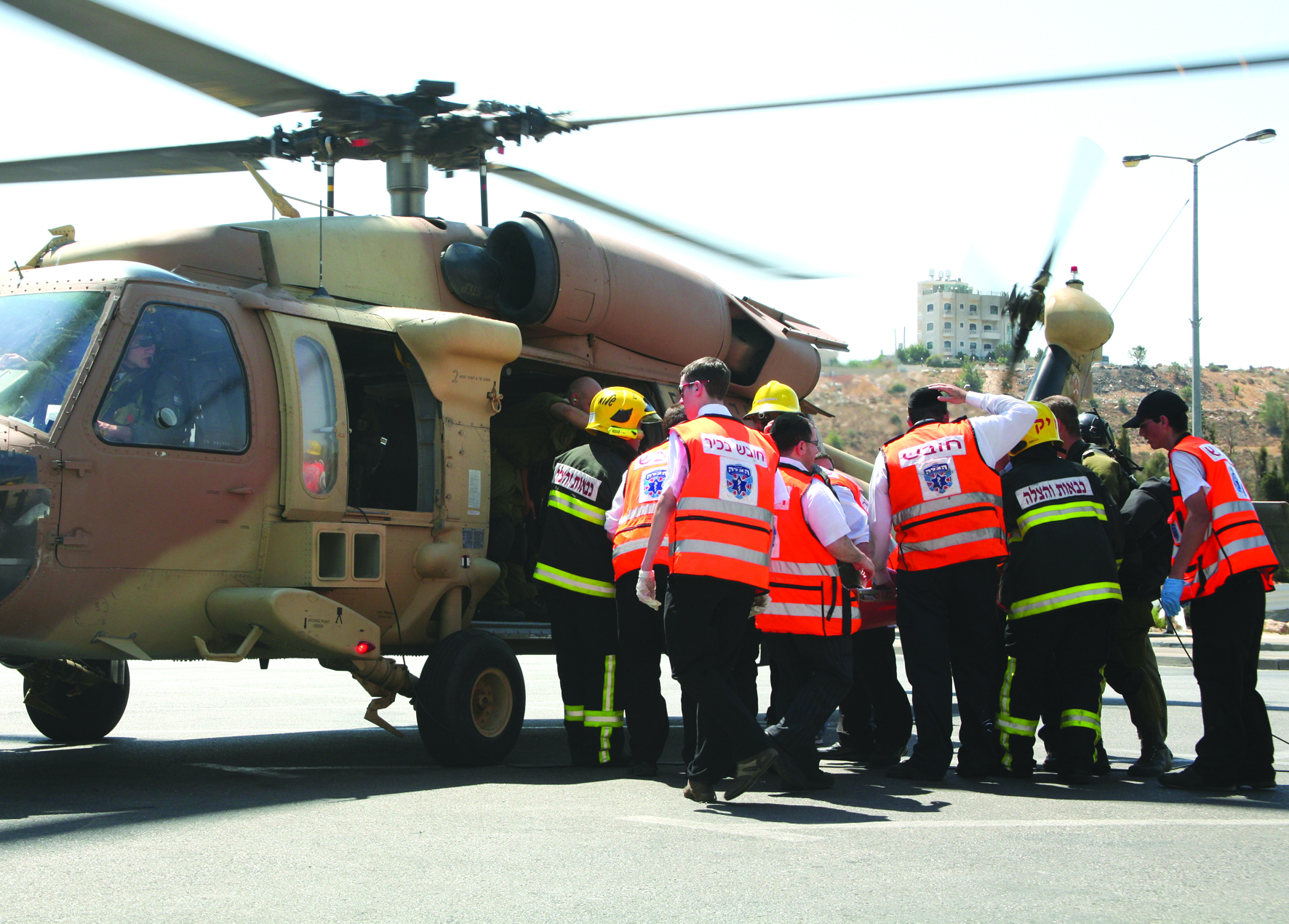
United Hatzalah of Israel helicopter rescue

As a young EMT in Jerusalem, Eli Beer recognized that heavy urban traffic and narrow streets often prevented ambulances from arriving in time to save a victim.

Initially, volunteers responded to fewer than 200 calls per day by monitoring two-way emergency radio scanners. As cellular technology evolved, volunteers migrated to a managed push-to-talk network, which enabled two-way communications between dispatchers and volunteer medics.

After the Second Lebanon War in 2006, Beer brought together more than 50 independent Hatzalah organizations to form United Hatzalah of Israel.

In 2008, United Hatzalah developed the LifeCompass GPS dispatch technology and mobile app medley capable of tracking the location of volunteers in real time, assessing the unique capabilities, mobility and equipment of the closest volunteers, and routing the most appropriate medics to any given emergency. Today, all volunteers receive a standard-issue smartphone linked to the second generation LifeCompass 2.0 command-and-control system.

United Hatzalah responded immediately to the calls for medical assistance following the Hamas-led attack on southern Israel on the morning of 7 October 2023. United Hatzalah set up a massive response in the south of Israel on the Gaza periphery to treat Israelis injured at the onset of the Gaza war, and set up medical clinics throughout the Gaza periphery to treat the wounded, alongside the IDF medical units. The organization worked around the clock to treat thousands of people within Israel and provides medical aid and supplies to civilians and military personnel affected by the 7 October rampage.

== Results and demographics ==
United Hatzalah currently responds to approximately 2,000 calls per day and as many as 12,000 calls during large-scale emergencies such as the October 7 attack on Israel. In 2023, the organization answered more than 750,000 calls, with a volunteer corps of 8,000 medics, and a fleet of 1,000 ambucycles.

United Hatzalah's lifesaving model has reduced average first-response time to three minutes. Sudden cardiac arrest calls are the best measure of emergency medical performance. Since United Hatzalah's inception, the rate of cardiac-arrest deaths has decreased by 50%, according to the Israel Heart Society. At 46.4 deaths per 100,000 people, the World Health Organization reported in 2011 that Israel ranks 12th best out of 192 countries in terms of coronary-related mortality.

United Hatzalah's volunteer base in 2018 is approximately 60% religious Jews, 30% secular Jews and 10% minorities (Muslim, Christian and Druze).

== Awards and recognition ==
In recognition of his dedication to saving lives and efforts to create a multicultural, apolitical EMS organization, Eli Beer, on behalf of United Hatzalah, has received numerous international accolades, including the Schwab Foundation for Social Entrepreneurship Social Entrepreneur Award (2010), the Israeli Presidential Award for Volunteerism (2011), the World Economic Forum (WEF) Young Global Leader award (2012), the Institute of International Education's Victor J. Goldberg Prize (2013), the OMETZ Social Responsibility Award (2015), the World Values Network Champion of Human Life Award (2016) and the Conference of European Rabbis Internet Entrepreneur Prize (2017).

In April 2013, Eli Beer presented a TedMed talk titled, "The fastest ambulance? A motorcycle," in which he describes the circumstances that led to him to re-imagine first-response medicine by training volunteer EMTs to respond to local emergencies and stabilize victims until official help arrives. The video has been viewed more than a million times to date.

During the March 2015 American-Israel Public Affairs Committee (AIPAC) Policy Conference in Washington DC, United Hatzalah was honored as a featured innovator in AIPAC's Innovation Showcase, serving to highlight emerging technology developed in Israel but with worldwide impact.

United Hatzalah has earned the Israeli Midot Seal of Effectiveness (2015), the GuideStar Platinum Participant status (2016) and Charity Navigator Four Star Rating (2016) for its operational professionalism and transparent management.

United Hatzalah was awarded the 2024 Health Minister’s Shield for Volunteering in recognition of its lifesaving efforts during the October 7 attacks, the Gaza war, and its ongoing contribution to public health in Israel.

== International aid ==
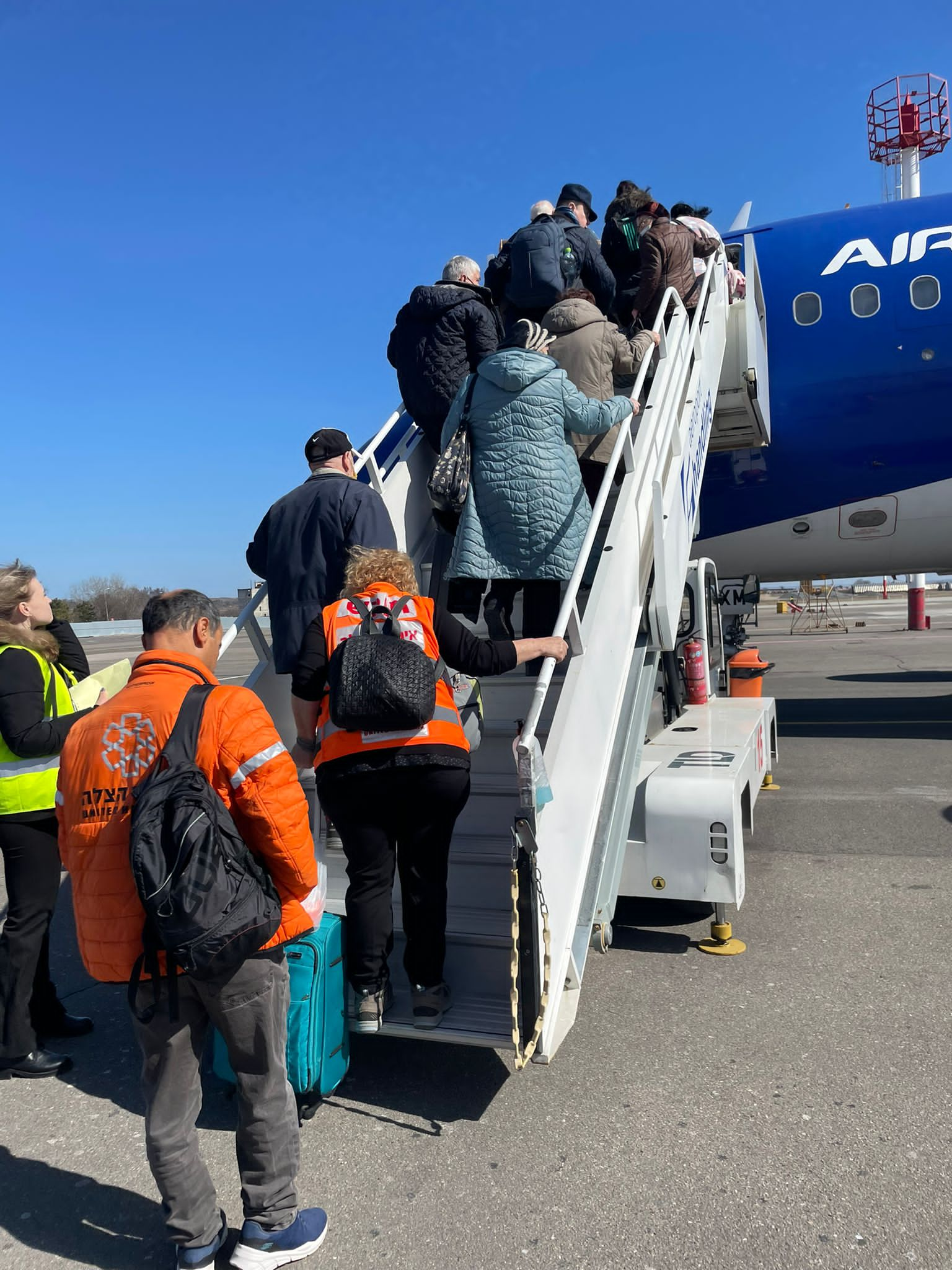
UH teams assist Ukrainian Refugees on flights to Israel as part of Operation Orange Wings

In addition to providing emergency medical services in Israel, United Hatzalah has been active in providing medical care, humanitarian aid, and psychological first aid, in numerous international disasters. The organization sent teams to Haiti multiple times, Nepal after the earthquake in 2015 as well as assisting after Hurricanes Irma and Harvey in 2017 in the United States.

The organization's Psychotrauma and Crisis Response Unit also responded to the Pittsburgh Tree of Life Synagogue Shooting in 2018, and to Miami following the Surfside condominium collapse in 2021. In 2022, the organization undertook a lengthy medical and humanitarian aid mission to Moldova and Ukraine following the Russo-Ukrainian War that involved providing medical and humanitarian aid and food to Ukrainian refugees in Moldova, as well as flying in medication and food for hospitals and communities inside Ukraine, and extracting injured and ill refugees from Ukraine to receive medical treatment in other countries. The organization also chartered a series of planes to bring in food and medical equipment and transport nearly 3,000 Ukrainian refugees to Israel in an operation codenamed Operation Orange Wings.

In February 2023, United Hatzalah assisted in search-and-rescue operations in Turkey following the 2023 Turkey–Syria earthquake, but cut short its mission due to intelligence of a "concrete and immediate threat" targeting the group. In September 2023, United Hatzalah deployed an international aid team to Morocco to assist in the search-and-rescue operations after the 2023 Al Haouz earthquake. The group assisted in helping locals affected, providing supplies and rendering medical aid.

== October 7 controversies ==
In the aftermath of the October 7, 2023, Hamas-led attacks on Israel, United Hatzalah and its founder, Eli Beer, faced scrutiny over the dissemination of unverified atrocity narratives and the framing of the organization’s response relative to other emergency services.

=== Unverified atrocity claims ===
During public appearances and fundraising events following the attacks, Eli Beer recounted graphic stories of atrocities that he claimed to have personally witnessed or verified. Notably, at the Republican Jewish Coalition conference in Las Vegas, Beer described an incident involving a pregnant woman whose stomach was allegedly cut open, and her unborn child stabbed, before she and her family were murdered. He also repeated claims that babies had been placed in ovens and burned alive.

=== Framing of emergency response and Magen David Adom ===
Controversy also arose regarding how United Hatzalah’s actions on October 7 were portrayed to donors, particularly in contrast to Israel’s national emergency medical service, Magen David Adom (MDA). Reports from fundraising events suggested a narrative where MDA personnel were ordered to hold back due to danger, while United Hatzalah volunteers charged forward. For instance, an article previewing a visit by Beer to Nashville quoted a donor who claimed to have been told that MDA was instructed not to enter dangerous areas, whereas United Hatzalah’s volunteer force did, resulting in casualties among their ranks.

This framing was criticized for misrepresenting the actions of MDA on that day. Public records and accounts confirm that MDA ambulances and helicopters operated under fire, and several MDA staff members, including paramedics Amit Mann and Aharon Haimov, were killed in action while treating victims. The contrast drawn in these fundraising narratives raised concerns, especially given a prior 2021 Tel Aviv District Court ruling that found United Hatzalah had engaged in a "coordinated plan to defame and libel Magen David Adom". The court had ordered United Hatzalah to pay damages for making false statements about MDA to the media.

== Annual concert ==
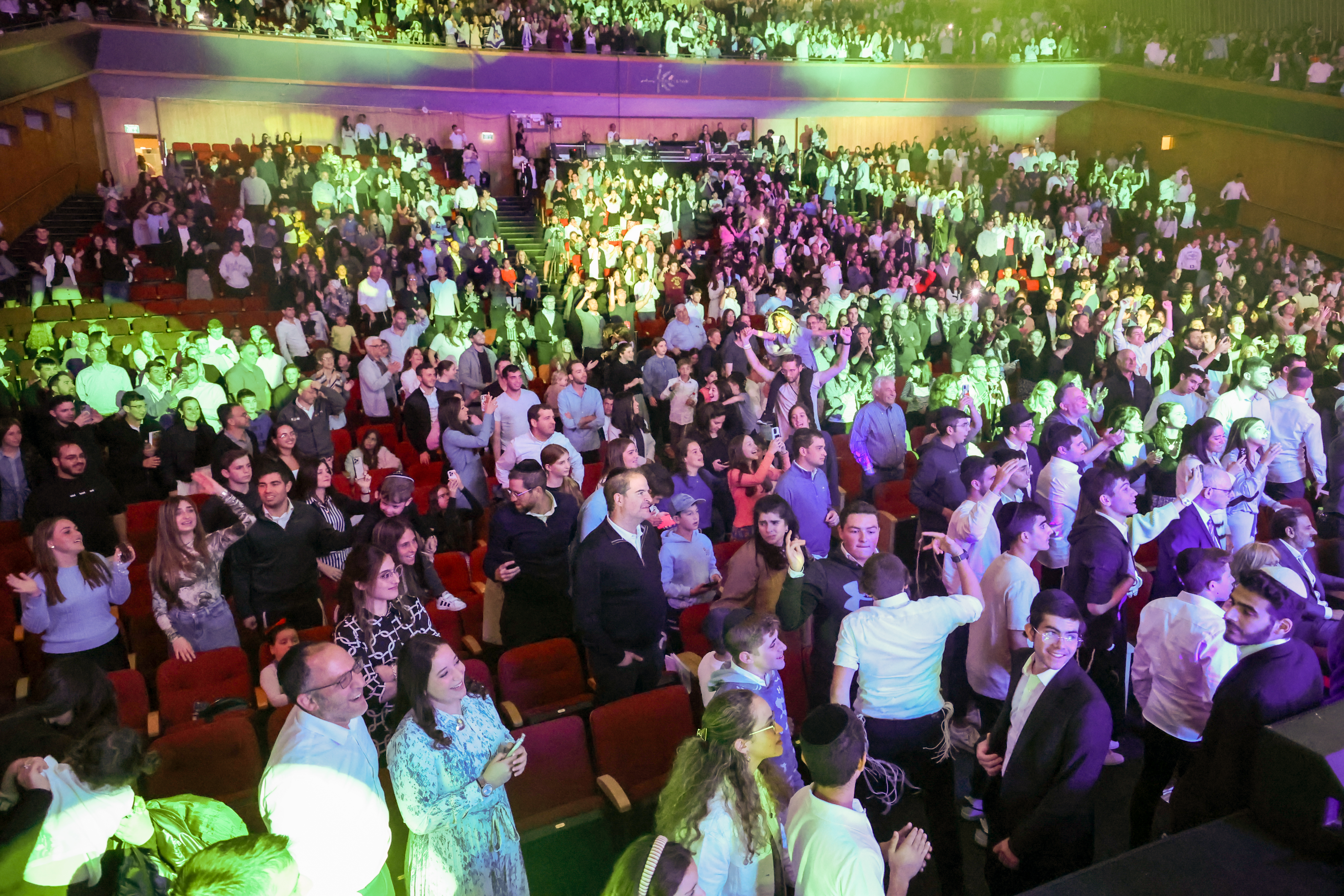
People at the 2024 United Hatzalah Concert

United Hatzalah organizes a concert on Sukkot. Over the years, the likes of Ishay Ribo, Gad Elbaz, Shmuel, Avraham Fried, Mordechai Shapiro and Lior Suchard have performed at it. At the 2024 concert, boxer Floyd Mayweather donated $100,000 to United Hatzalah during the concert.

== See also ==
- Healthcare in Israel
- Emergency medical services in Israel
