= Emergency medical services in Israel =

Emergency medical services in Israel are provided by the Magen David Adom (MDA) organizational. The Palestinian Red Crescent Society operates in parts of the occupied Palestinian territories. The phone number to call for an ambulance is 101.

== Organization ==
=== Land Ambulance ===
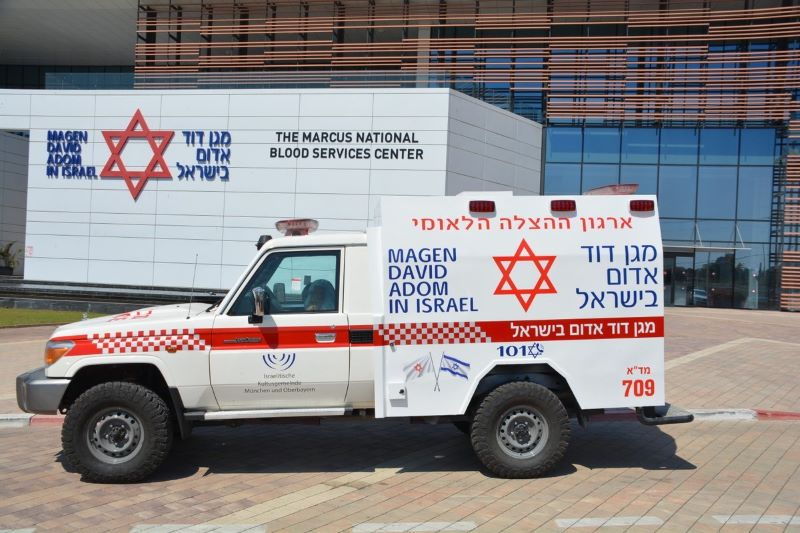
Armoured Mobile Intensive Care Unit

Magen David Adom is the nationally recognized EMS organization of the State of Israel. MDA consists of between 26,000 and 39,200 volunteers and 2550 employees, Paramedics and first responders. The organization operates 166 stations with a fleet of over 1000 ambulances. The majority of the fleet consists of Basic Life Support (BLS) ambulances. These are supplemented by Advanced Life Support (ALS) ambulances, mobile intensive care units (MICU) and a variety of first responders. In an unusual feature, armored ambulances are not uncommon nationwide. The system is highly dependent on volunteers, many of whom are from outside of Israel. As a recognized national aid society, according to the Geneva Conventions, MDA may become an auxiliary arm of the Israeli Defence Force during wartime. Most major stations also include special units for responding to mass-casualty incidents like natural disasters or terrorist attacks. The system, for the most part, used to conform to the Franco-German (as opposed to the Anglo-American) model of EMS care, and the presence of physicians at high-acuity emergencies was not uncommon. As of 2015, MDA no longer employs physicians on its ALS/MICU ambulances, volunteer physicians may still be encountered in the field, but employee physicians' main task is to provide on-line medical support through a special hot-line. United Hatzalah consists of 6,000 fully trained first response volunteers, that provide completely free services and whose mission it is to fill the gap between when the emergency occurs and the arrival of an ambulance. United Hatzalah volunteers utilize various vehicles, including ambucycles, e-bikes, ambuboats, ATVs and more in order to reach the patients in their most vital time of need. They have succeeded at trimming the national average EMS response time to less than three minutes and in urban areas to less than 90 seconds. In addition, emergency ambulance service is supplemented by a variety of private carriers who are tasked with interfacility transfers only.

=== Air Ambulance ===
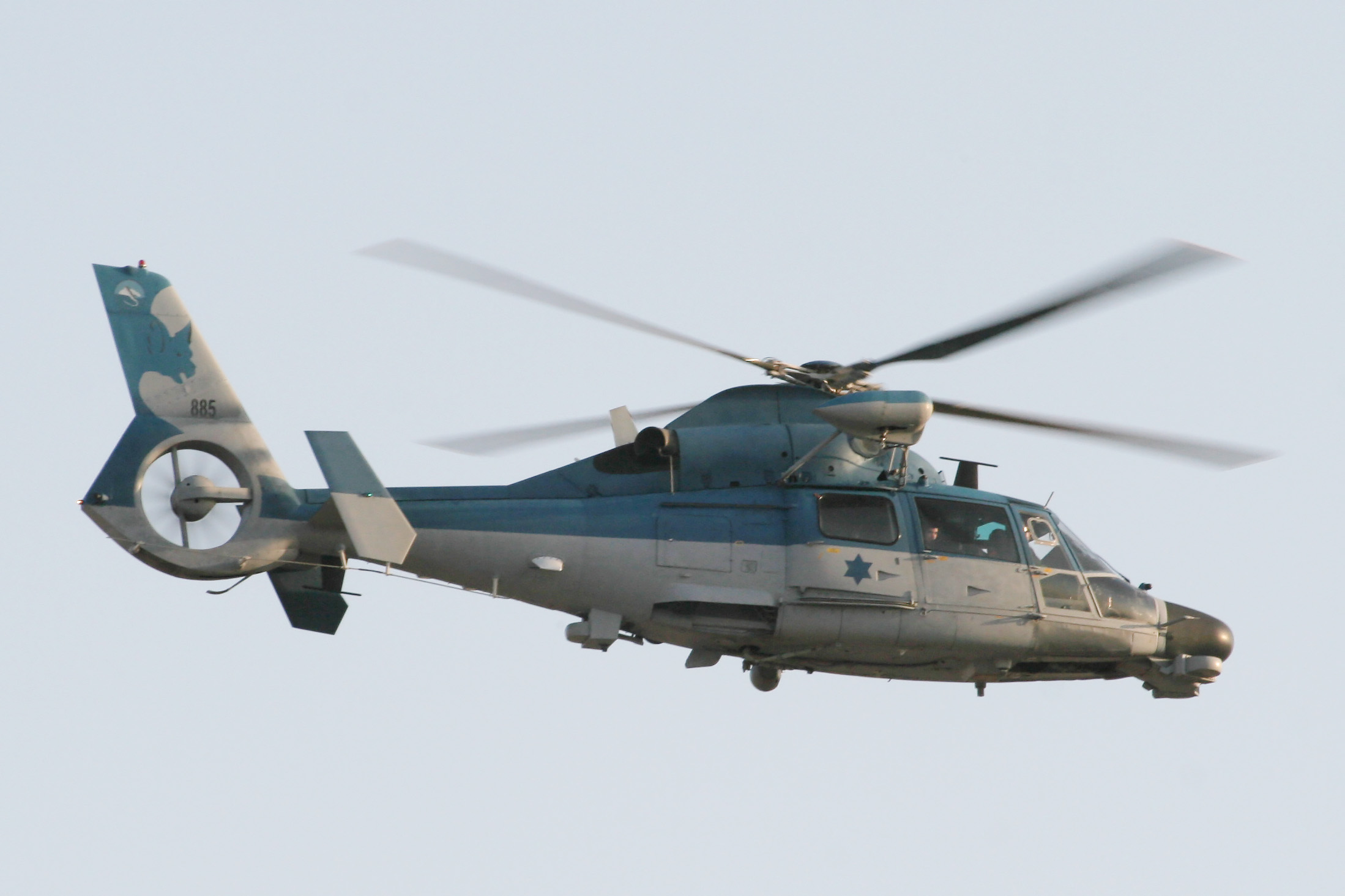
Prior to 2008, air ambulance service was provided by the military.

Air ambulance service was provided by Israeli Air Force MEDEVAC helicopters, however, in 2008, civil HEMS was introduced by Magen David Adom in partnership with a private company called Lahak Aviation Ltd, utilizing four German-made MBB Bo 105s staffed with MDA paramedics. Lahak deployed them throughout the country in order to improve response times in peripheral areas. Previous attempts to integrate independent helicopter service in the 1970s were unsuccessful due to high cost. Non-emergency and repatriation air ambulance service is normally provided by a variety of private charter carriers, such as Arrow Aviation in Israel.

== Standards ==
=== Vehicles ===
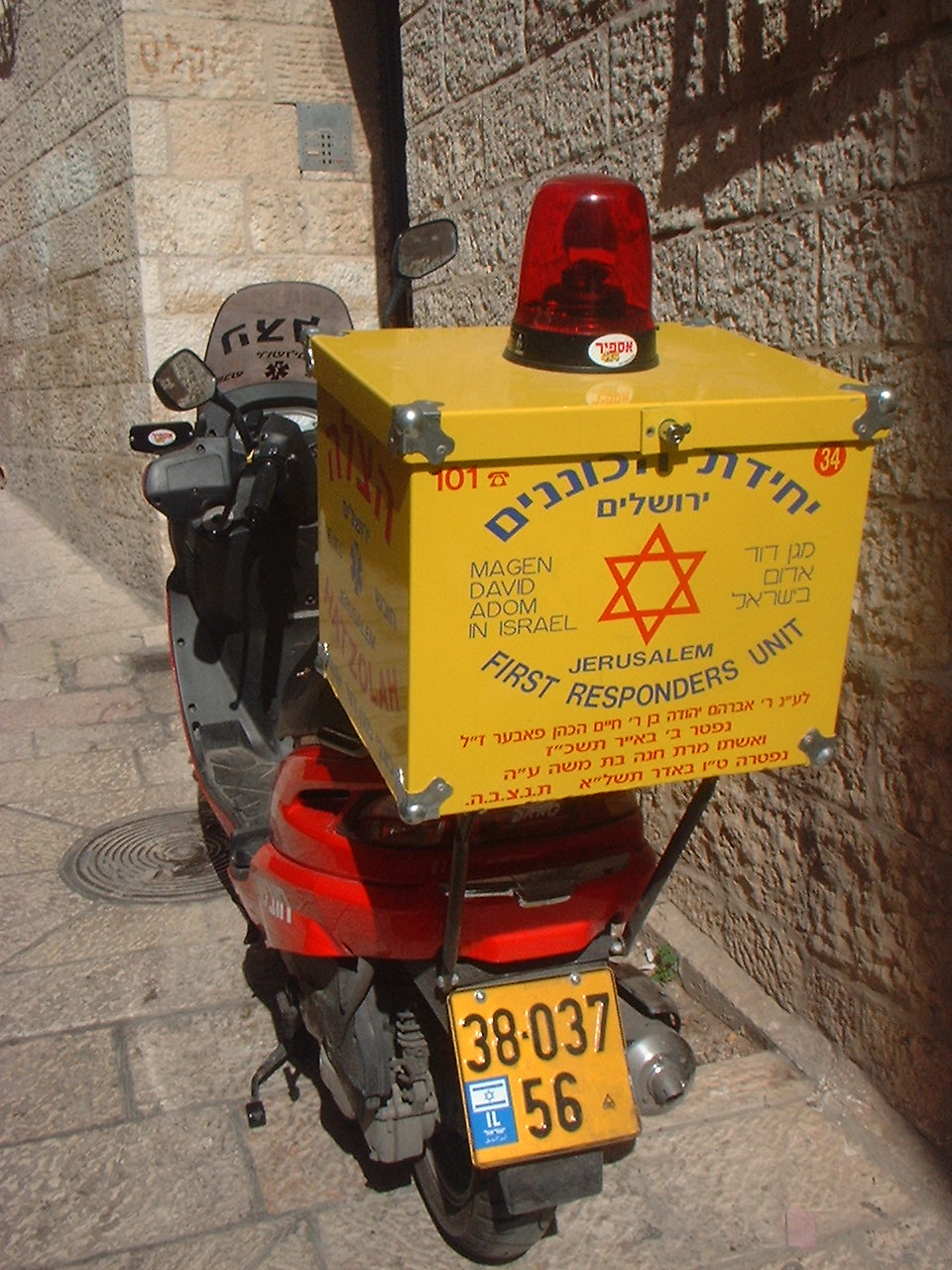
MDA First Responder

Most of the fleet is made up of regular size vans staffed by "medics" (Hovesh) and "advanced medics" (Hovesh Bachir) as well as an additional Hovesh or a first responder, and advanced life support ambulances, staffed by paramedics; mobile intensive care units, staffed by paramedics, respond only to the most medically serious cases. The vehicles compare in general terms with American or European ambulances, however, compliance with either the KKK 1822 or CEN 1789 standard is not compulsory. In addition, first responders will often proceed to calls in their own vehicles, and could be anything from a private car to a motorbike.

=== Training and staffing ===
As previously stated, the MDA uses a broad range of staff from First Responders to Paramedics, and both volunteers and paid staff. First responders typically receive 60 hours of training to prepare them for their roles. Paid employees are required to be certified at the Hovesh level, which requires approximately 170–200 hours of training. The next step is the Hovesh Bachir (EMT-I) which requires a further four weeks of training or a part-time 180 additional hours of training. Those certified at the Hovesh level (EMT-B) are permitted to operate AEDs and to start IVs.(AED) Paramedics may be trained over a period of 15 months, with nine months of didactic and hospital clinical time, and a six-month preceptorship with a qualified paramedic on a mobile intensive care unit ambulance. Increasingly, however, paramedics are choosing another option; obtaining a three-year B.EMS degree in Emergency Medicine from Ben Gurion University in Beer Sheva or Zefat Academic College in Zefat. In an unusual move aimed at raising revenue to offset operating costs, MDA has begun to market its expertise at emergency care and system organization on an international level. They have achieved some success in this endeavour, assisting the nation of Chile with the development of a national EMS system. United Hatzalah trains all of their volunteers to the level of EMT-b requiring them to participate in 180 hours of in-class training followed by an additional 100 hours of training with a veteran first responder.

=== Dispatch ===
Ambulances are dispatched from regional dispatch centres, except during wars or other emergencies when service is provided from a national dispatch centre. This centre uses dispatch technologies such as Automatic Vehicle Locating (AVL) and decision-support software that are comparable with U.S. and European systems. The national emergency number for an ambulance in Israel is 101. This number is answered by MDA around the clock. United Hatzalah volunteers are always on call wherever they happen to be located and the five closest volunteers are dispatched to the scene of any medical emergency in the country. Having the volunteers respond from wherever they are significantly cuts downs emergency medical response time and alleviates pressure on the ambulance services, while simultaneously galvanizing and increasing community resiliency.

=== Response times ===
According to 2011 figures, the average MDA ambulance response time in Israel is 9 minutes. First responders from United Hatzalah have a national average response time of three minutes, and in large metropolitan areas less than 90 seconds.

== See also ==
- Healthcare in Israel
