= Magen David Adom =

Israeli medical service, Red Cross member

- מָגֵן דָּוִד אָדוֹם
- Logo of Magen David Adom
- Founded: 1899 (first use of name) (Note: The first use of the "Magen David Adom" was during the Anglo Boer War in South Africa (1899–1902) when it was used by the Ambulance Corps founded by Ben Zion Aaron in Johannesburg as a first aid corps to assist the Boer forces. Permission was given by President Paul Kruger of the South African Republic for the Star of David to be used as its insignia, rather than the conventional red cross.); 7 June 1930 (MDA)
- Type: Non-governmental organization, Non-profit organization
- Purpose: Humanitarian
- Location(s): Israel (only in Israel)
- Region served: Worldwide
- Product: Emergency medical services
- Method: Aid
- Members: International Red Cross and Red Crescent Movement
- Affiliations: Ben Gurion University of the Negev
- Budget: ₪685.684 million (2019)
- Employees: 1,200
- Volunteers: 26,000+
- Website: www.mdais.org

The Magen David Adom (Hebrew: מָגֵן דָּוִד אָדוֹם, abbr. MDA, pronounced MAH-dah per its Hebrew acronym, מד״א) is Israel's national emergency medical, disaster, ambulance and blood bank service. The literal meaning of the name is "Red Shield of David", but the symbol is more frequently called the "Red Star of David" in many languages. Since June 2006, Magen David Adom has been officially recognized by the International Committee of the Red Cross (ICRC) as the national aid society of the State of Israel under the Geneva Conventions, and a member of the International Federation of Red Cross and Red Crescent Societies. MDA has a dedicated medical emergency phone number in Israel, 101. MDA can become an auxiliary arm of the Israel Defense Forces during times of war. In 2022, MDA became academically affiliated with Ben-Gurion University of the Negev. Following the October 7th attacks against Israel, the American Red Cross presented Magen David Adom with the International Humanitarian Service Award stating that the organization "exemplifies and inspires the humanitarian values of human dignity, respect, [and] compassion".

== History ==
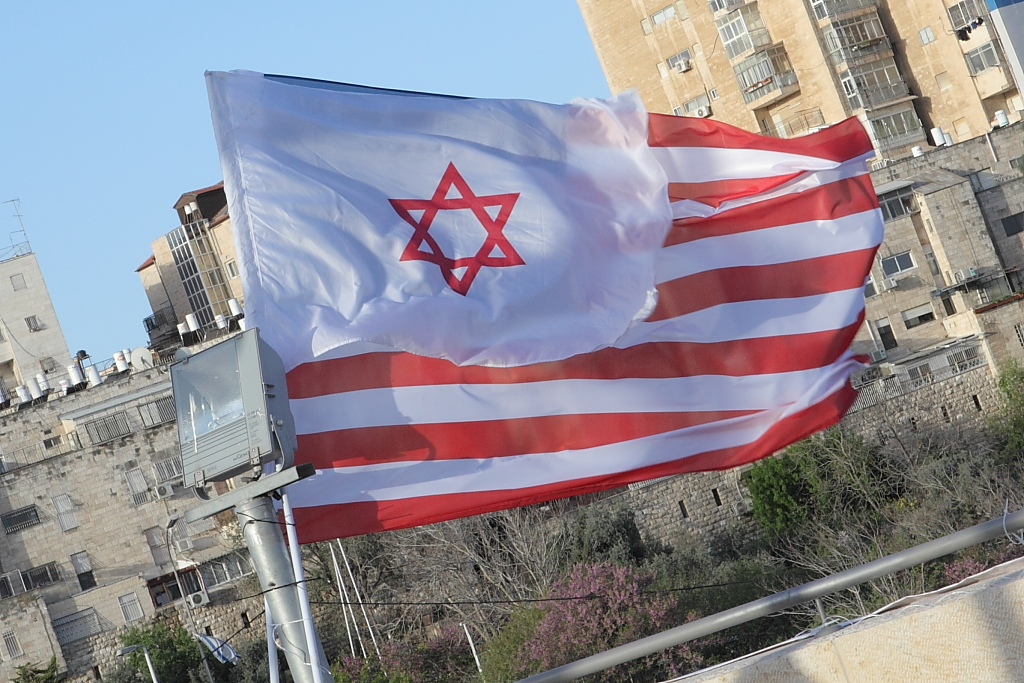
The Red Magen David headquarters in Jerusalem

The Magen David Adom organization was formed by nurse Dr. Meshulam Levontin in 1930 as a volunteer association with a single branch in Tel Aviv. Moshe Frenkel founded the first statewide branch of Magen David Adom. After opening branches in Jerusalem and Haifa, it was extended nationwide five years later, providing medical support to the public including not only Jews, but also Arabs (Muslim, Druze, and Christian). On 12 July 1950, the Knesset passed a law giving MDA official status as Israel's national emergency service. The objectives of Magen David Adom include maintaining first aid services; maintaining a storage service of blood, plasma and their by-products; instruction in first aid and pre-hospital emergency medicine; operating a volunteer program in which volunteers are trained in first aid, basic and advanced life support including mobile intensive care units; transportation of patients, women in labor, and evacuation of those wounded and killed in road accidents; and transportation of doctors, nurses and medical auxiliary forces. In the late 1960s, the organization refocused its rapid trauma treatment and transport protocols due to the efforts of Dr. Nancy Caroline. Caroline's work at Magen David Adom was based upon studies she conducted with Dr. Peter Safar and the Freedom House Paramedics of Pittsburgh.

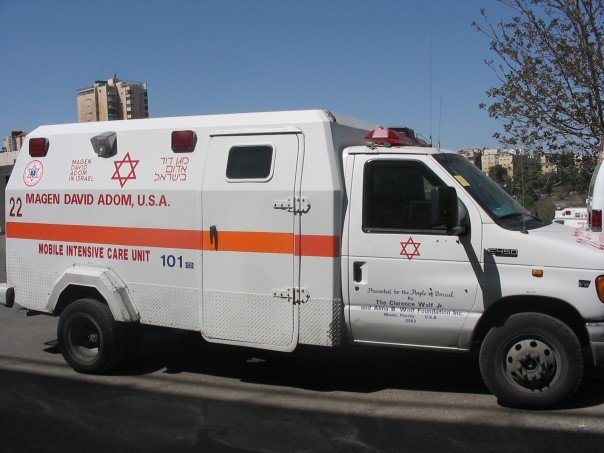
Armored mobile intensive care unit, Jerusalem District 2006

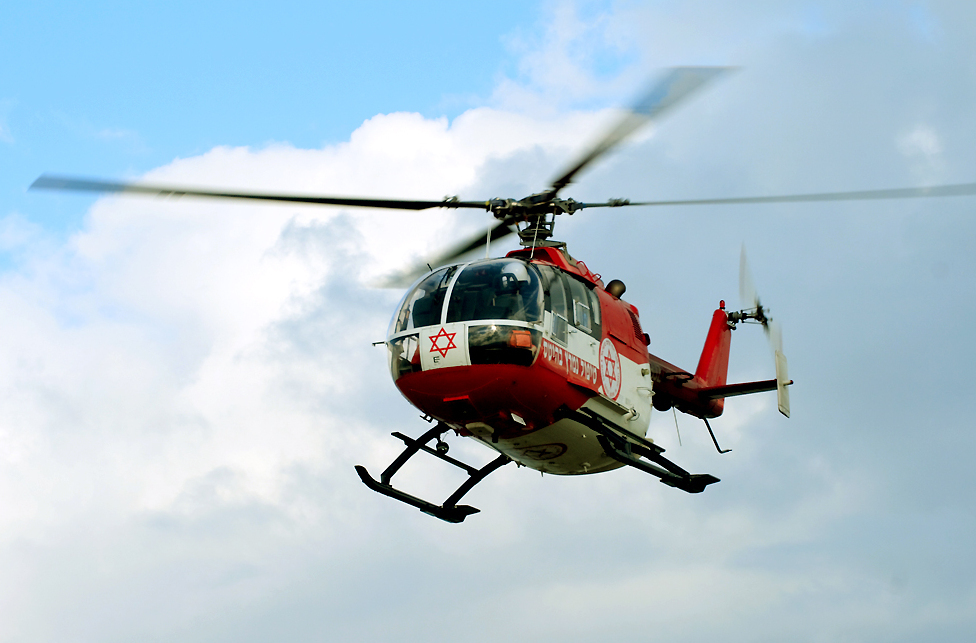
Helicopter of Magen David Adom

== Volunteers ==
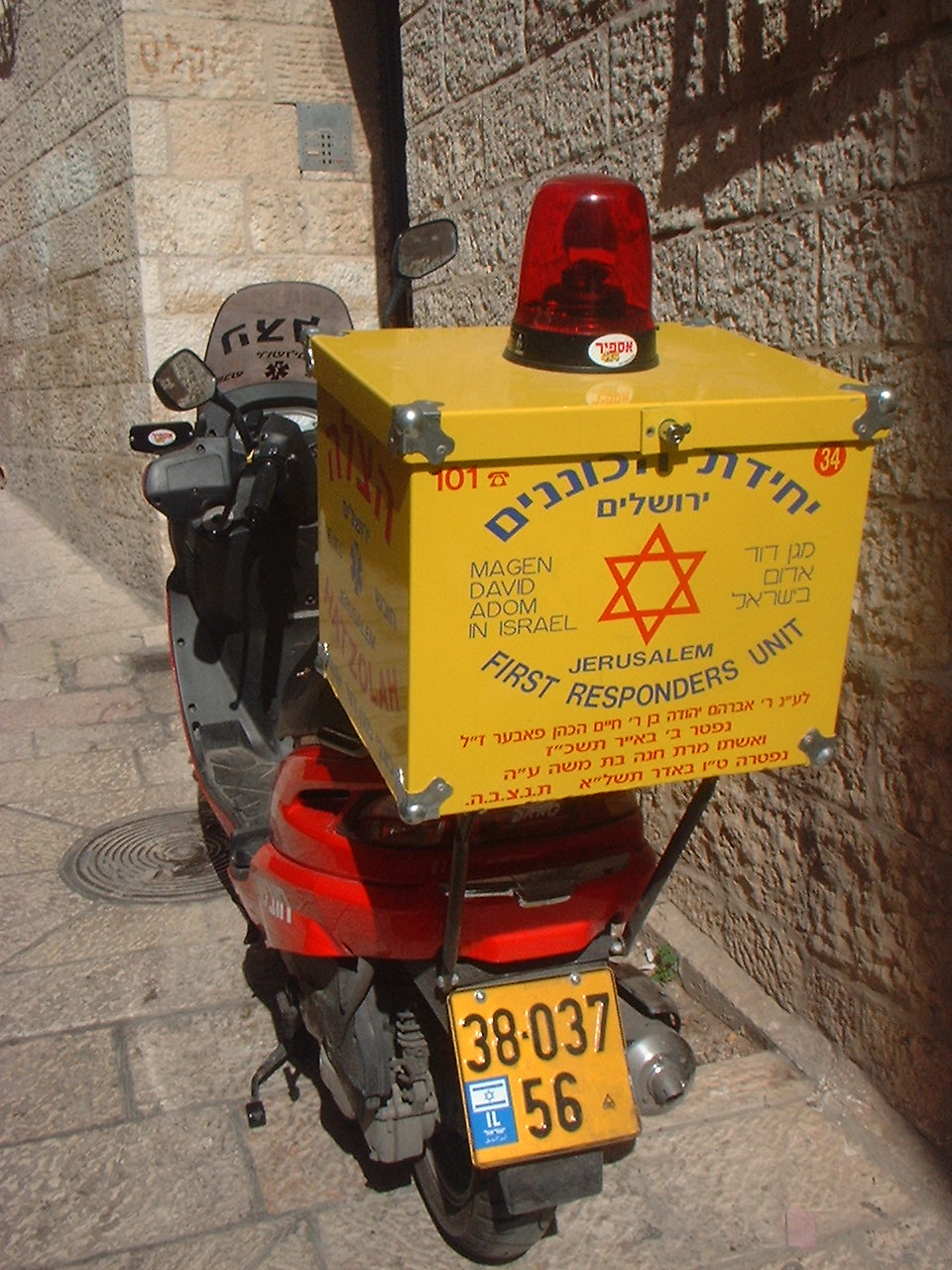
An MDA motorcycle used by a community first responder in Jerusalem's Old City

The third protocol emblem, also known as the Red Crystal

International emblem for MDA outside Israel

Geneva Conventions' "third protocol emblems"

Magen David Adom is mainly staffed by volunteers, and has over 26,000 people volunteering and over one million combined man-hours per year. The minimum age to join Magen David Adom's basic first aid course and become a volunteer is 15.

Since 2001, international volunteers aged 18 and over have the option to come to Israel for a two-month MDA Overseas Program. The program was initially named after its founder and first coordinator Yochai Porat, who was killed by a sniper on 3 March 2002 while serving reserve duty as a combat medic in the Israel Defense Forces. All volunteers pass a 60-hour course that covers a wide range of topics ranging from common medical conditions and trauma situations to mass casualty events. Those who pass the course are then dispatched throughout the country and work with local volunteers in ambulances to provide initial medical care on the regular and Mobile Intensive Care Ambulances.

While the program was originally financially supported by the Jewish Agency for Israel, it has recently been taken over by the Israel Experience organization, which also offers programs for Jewish youths on Birthright Israel trips.

Visitors to Israel are also welcome to donate blood through the "Sharing for Life" program. Since its inception in 2001, increasing numbers of people have donated blood, usually through groups such as Christian solidarity missions, or family Bar-Bat Mitzvas, especially during seasonal traditional pilgrimage times, such as Passover and Easter.

== Current status ==
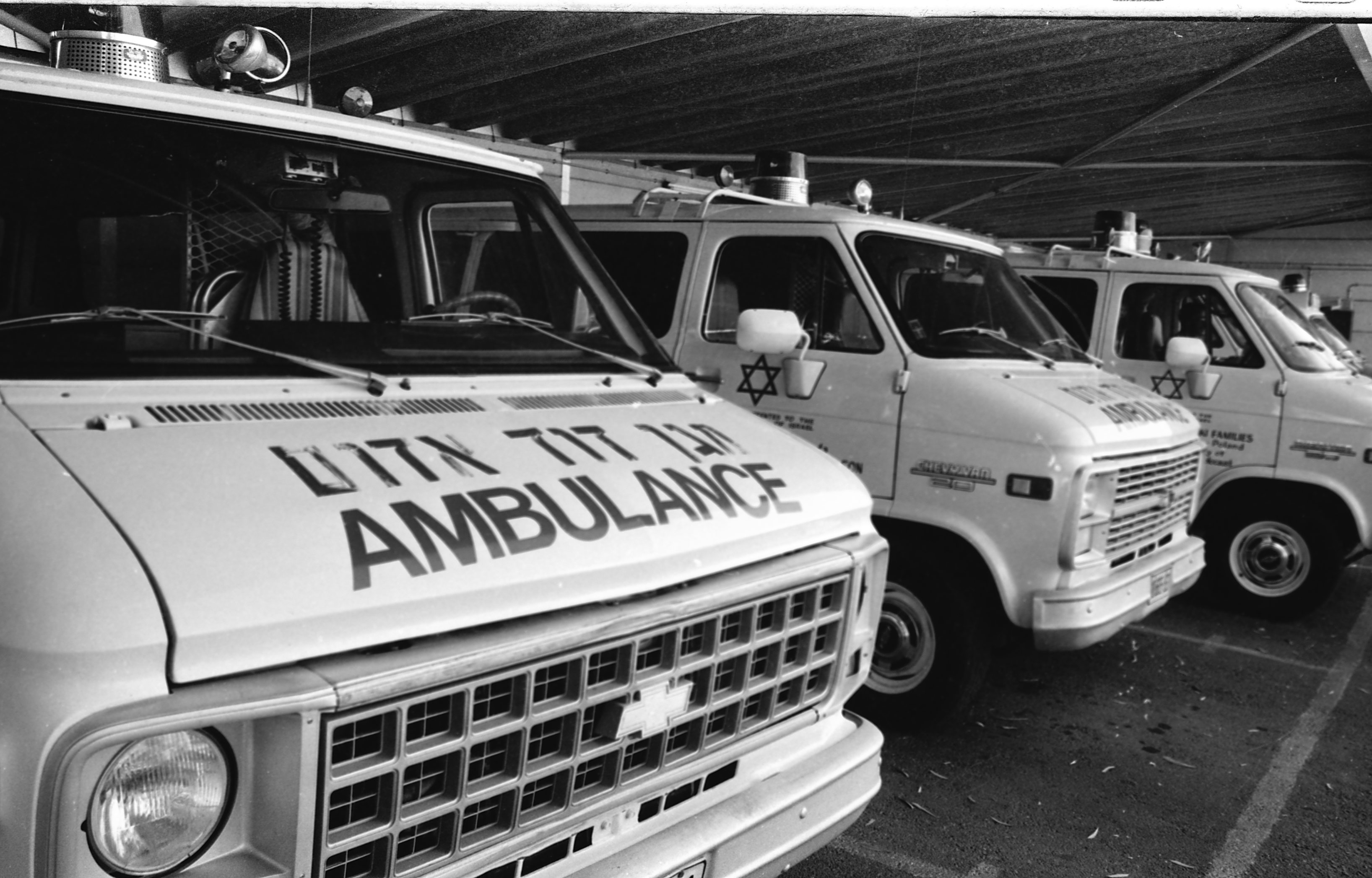
Magen David Adom ambulances in 1984

Although MDA currently staffs approximately 4,000 emergency medical technicians (EMTs), paramedics and emergency physicians, it still relies heavily on over 26,000 volunteers who serve in both operational and administrative capacities. MDA headquarters and its blood bank are located at the Tel HaShomer complex in the center of the country. The organization operates 189 stations over the country, with a fleet of over 2,000 ambulances nationwide. Among them are mobile intensive care units (MICU), special ambulances equipped for mass casualty events, and armored ambulances. Most of the fleet is made up of regular size vans providing Basic Life Support. These are called Lavan (which in Hebrew means "White") due to their external aspect and to differentiate them from the MICU, which have orange stripes on the sides. They are used by EMTs who generally have ranks equivalent to Basic and Intermediate EMTs in the US. In Israel, they are called ma'ar (first responders), ma'ar bachir (Certified first responder over 18, with some additional training), chovesh (EMT-B), and chovesh bachir (EMT-I). Ambulance drivers are EMTs or higher with a driver's license for emergency vehicles. MICUs similar to the US Type II units and used by paramedics and physicians respond only to the most medically serious cases. They are called Natan (if a physician is on board) or Atan (if it is only staffed by paramedics and EMTs). Major stations include special units (called "Taaran") for responding to mass casualty events such as natural disasters or terrorist attacks.

In some cases air ambulance service is provided by Israeli Air Force 669 unit with MEDEVAC helicopters. However, in 2008, MDA started to provide paramedics for three EMS MBB Bo 105s imported from Germany by Lahak Aviation Ltd. These three helicopters (out of four brought by Lahak) are operated by Lahak Aviation's operating company, Shapirit Air Services Ltd., as ambulance helicopters. Previous attempts by MDA to integrate independent helicopter service in the 1970s were unsuccessful because of high cost.

MDA has a control and dispatch centre for ambulances and paramedics in a hardened high-security room three floors under its headquarters building. MDA has a dedicated medical emergency telephone number in Israel, 101.

Unique among civilian emergency medical services due to its role as national aid society according to the Geneva Conventions, MDA can become an auxiliary arm of the Israel Defense Forces during times of war.

The average ambulance response time in Israel is 8.3 minutes (measured from the moment a dispatch request is received to arrival at the scene of an emergency). Calls to 101 are answered within four seconds. As of 2021, MDA handles approximately 2.7 million medical emergency phone calls to 101 per year.

Decommissioned MDA ambulances have been donated to a number of kibbutzim, moshavim, factories, and communities on both sides of the Green Line. Crews manning these lifesaving vehicles are trained and certified by Magen David Adom.

== Relation to International Red Cross and Red Crescent Movement ==
Until 2006, Magen David Adom was denied membership in the International Red Cross and Red Crescent Movement since it had refused to replace its red Star of David emblem with a pre-approved symbol.

The stated reason for the denial of membership was concerns about symbol proliferation; at the same 1929 conference that granted use of the Red Crescent and Red Lion and Sun, a limitation was placed on acceptance of any further emblems. The "Red Star of David" symbol was not submitted to the ICRC until 1931.

Similar concerns of India, Ceylon, and the former Soviet Union regarding the use of non-Hindu and seemingly religious symbols were also dismissed by the ICRC, but their national bodies chose to adopt the Red Cross as their official emblems in order to gain entry. The Red Cross—the inverse of the Swiss flag, the country of origin of the founder of the Red Cross and Red Crescent Movement—is not intended as a religious symbol, but is often perceived as such.

In her March 2000 letter to the International Herald Tribune and the New York Times, Dr. Bernadine Healy, then president of the American Red Cross, wrote: "The international committee's feared proliferation of symbols is a pitiful fig leaf, used for decades as the reason for excluding the Magen David Adom—the Shield (or Star) of David." In protest, the American Red Cross withheld millions in administrative funding to the International Federation of Red Cross and Red Crescent Societies (IFRC) since May 2000.

Since the mid-1990s, there has been extensive and growing co-operation between MDA and the ICRC including, among other things, a $2.2 million expenditure on strengthening ties between the two organizations, the signing in 2000 of a two-year co-operation statement, the permanent placement of an ICRC co-operation officer in MDA headquarters, and extensive support of the MDA's blood bank activities. In addition, there are bilateral cooperation agreements between MDA and a number of national Red Cross societies.

On 7 December 2005, a diplomatic conference of states party to the Geneva Conventions adopted a third additional protocol, thereby introducing a new protective emblem, dubbed the Red Crystal. This third protocol emblem is hailed as a universal emblem free of religious, ethnic, or political connotation. The new symbol is a red square frame tilted at a forty-five–degree angle. According to the rules of the third additional protocol, MDA can continue to use the Red Star of David as its sole emblem for indicative purposes within Israel. For indicative use in missions abroad, MDA can, depending on the specific situation in the host country, either incorporate the Red Star of David inside the Red Crystal or use the Red Crystal alone.

On 22 June 2006, MDA was recognised by the ICRC and admitted as a full member of the International Federation of Red Cross and Red Crescent societies, following adoption of the Red Crystal symbol in the statutes of the International Red Cross and Red Crescent Movement on the same level as the Red Cross and Red Crescent symbols.

The MDA's admission to the International Federation was conditioned on agreements signed in 2005 with the Palestine Red Crescent Society. Under these agreements, the red Magen David symbol could not be used in countries other than Israel; moreover the MDA agreed not to operate in the West Bank or in East Jerusalem.

=== Service in the West Bank ===
Under the 2005 agreements, the MDA agreed to operate within the international legal framework applicable to the West Bank and recognized that the Palestine Red Cross Society was the authorized national society in the Palestinian territory. The MDA had therefore to discontinue its operations in the West Bank. In December 2011, the International Conference of the International Red Cross and Red Crescent Movement "noted with regret" that the 2005 agreement had not been fully implemented and decided to continue the monitoring process. A few months earlier, Dani Dayan from the Yesha Council, a settler organization, had accused the MDA of removing the red Magen David from ambulances operating in the West Bank. Dayan asserted that the MDA was doing so under pressure from the International Committee of the Red Cross. An MDA spokesman replied that the MDA continued to use the classic Red Star logo on its ambulances housed in 12 places across the West Bank. In October 2011 Yonatan Yagodovsky, director of MDA's fundraising department, declared that "the MDA will continue to use its emblem and logo, and no one ever asked us to take it off." In January 2012, the ICRC confirmed that MDA had in fact agreed to stop all services within the West Bank. Rescue efforts would "officially" be administered by regional councils instead, and would not use the red Magen David symbol. As a result, many contributors reportedly stopped donating to the MDA; some young settlers, a considerable percentage of the volunteer force, stopped volunteering for the MDA in protest.

In 2016, Palestinian groups said MDA continued to violate the stipulation that its paramedic teams would use a neutral emblem while working outside the country, and called on the ICRC to expel the group.

== Tracing service ==
Magen David Adom's tracing service was established to assist in locating relatives lost in the Holocaust. In 2000–2007, the service handled 5,000 applications.

== Donor eligibility ==
Magen David Adom provides some restrictions on who can donate blood, largely in line with CDC guidelines. For example, donors must be above 18 years old (or 17 years old with parental permission) and below 65 years old. As of January 2018, however, Magen David Adom allows men who have sex with men to donate blood. Restrictions that previously barred Ethiopian immigrants from donating blood were also dropped.

== Ranks ==
Management and senior administration
Rank	Rav-Magen	Magen	Tat-Magen	Magen Mishne	Sgan-Magen	Magen Rishon
Insignia						
Role	General Director of the MDA	Division director	Area director Deputy division director	Department director	Deputy laboratory director Assistant department director	Supervision Section Supervisor; Paramedic educator Chair of Volunteer Management Serving on the MDA Council; Junior laboratory director

Paramedics
Rank	Rav-Mazar		Mazar Bakhir Mitkadem	Mazar Bakhir	Mazar Mitkadem	Mazar Sheni	Mazar
Insignia							
Role	Chief of station Coordinator of blood donation operations		Chief paramedic	Paramedic with 14–23 years experience	Paramedic with 8–14 years experience	Paramedic with 3–8 years experience	Paramedic with less than 3 years experience
Medical Assistants and Blood Donation Operators
Rank	Rav-Matan Bakhir	Rav-Matan	Matan Bakhir Mitkadem	Matan Bakhir	Matan Mitkadem	Matan Sheni	Matan
Insignia							
Role		Station-Driver supervisor	Senior emergency medical assistant Head of blood donation group	Emergency medical assistant Blood donation group supervisor	Head of shift Blood donation supervisor	Senior medical assistant Senior blood donation operator	Medical assistant Blood donation operator

== Gallery ==
Magen David Adom

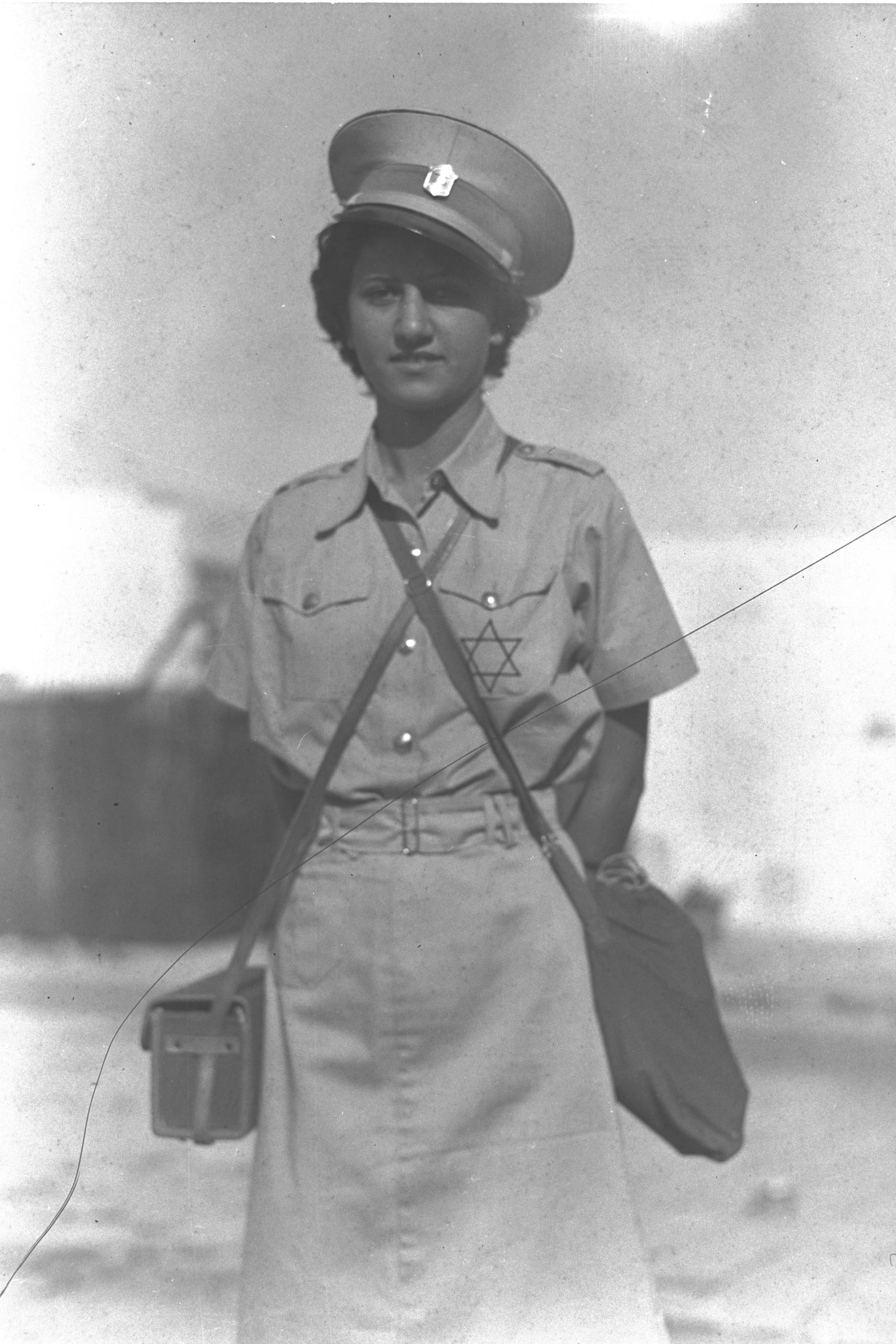
A Magen David Adom paramedic in the Tel Aviv civil defense, 1939

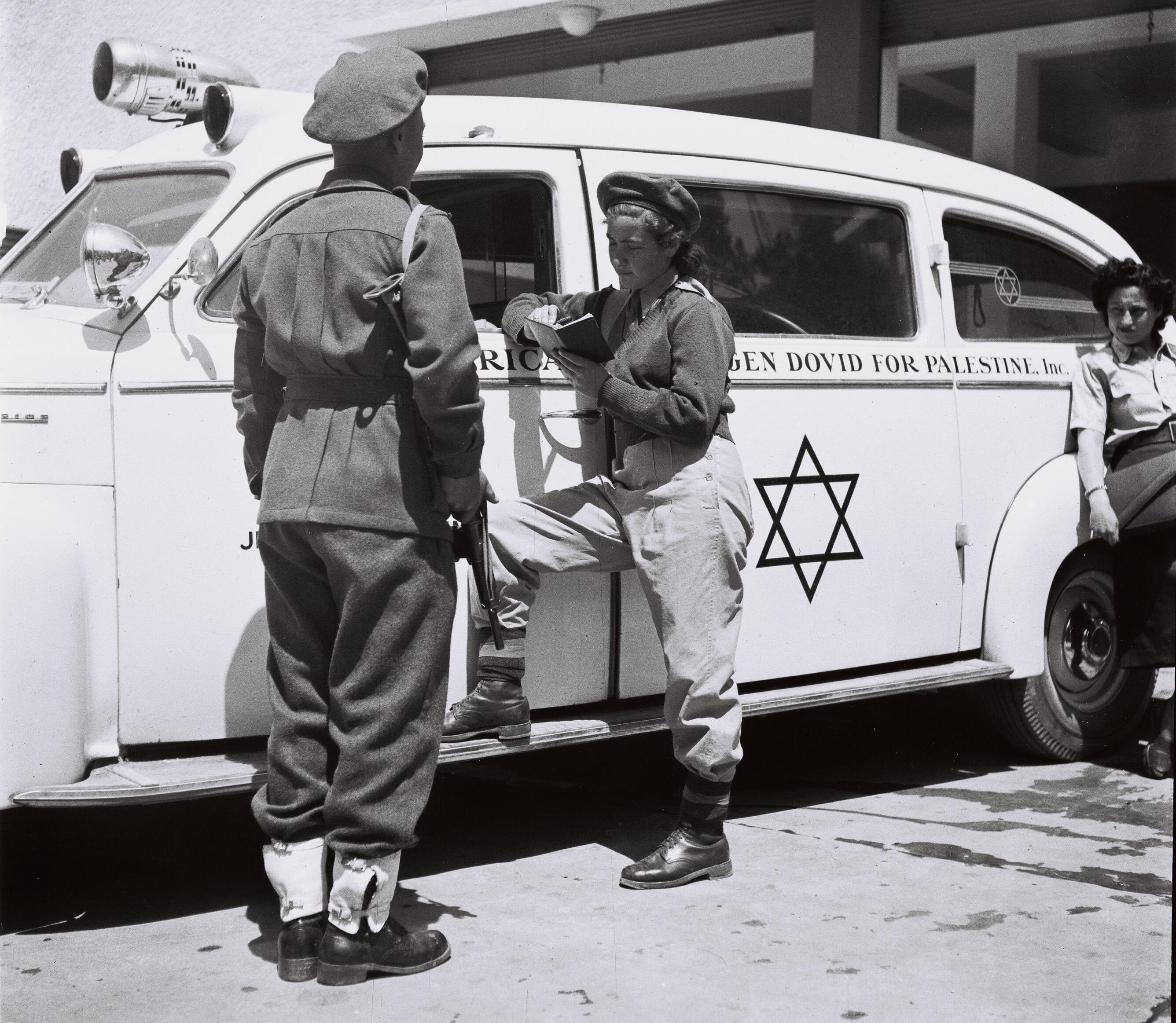
A Magen David Adom ambulance in June 1948, Palestine

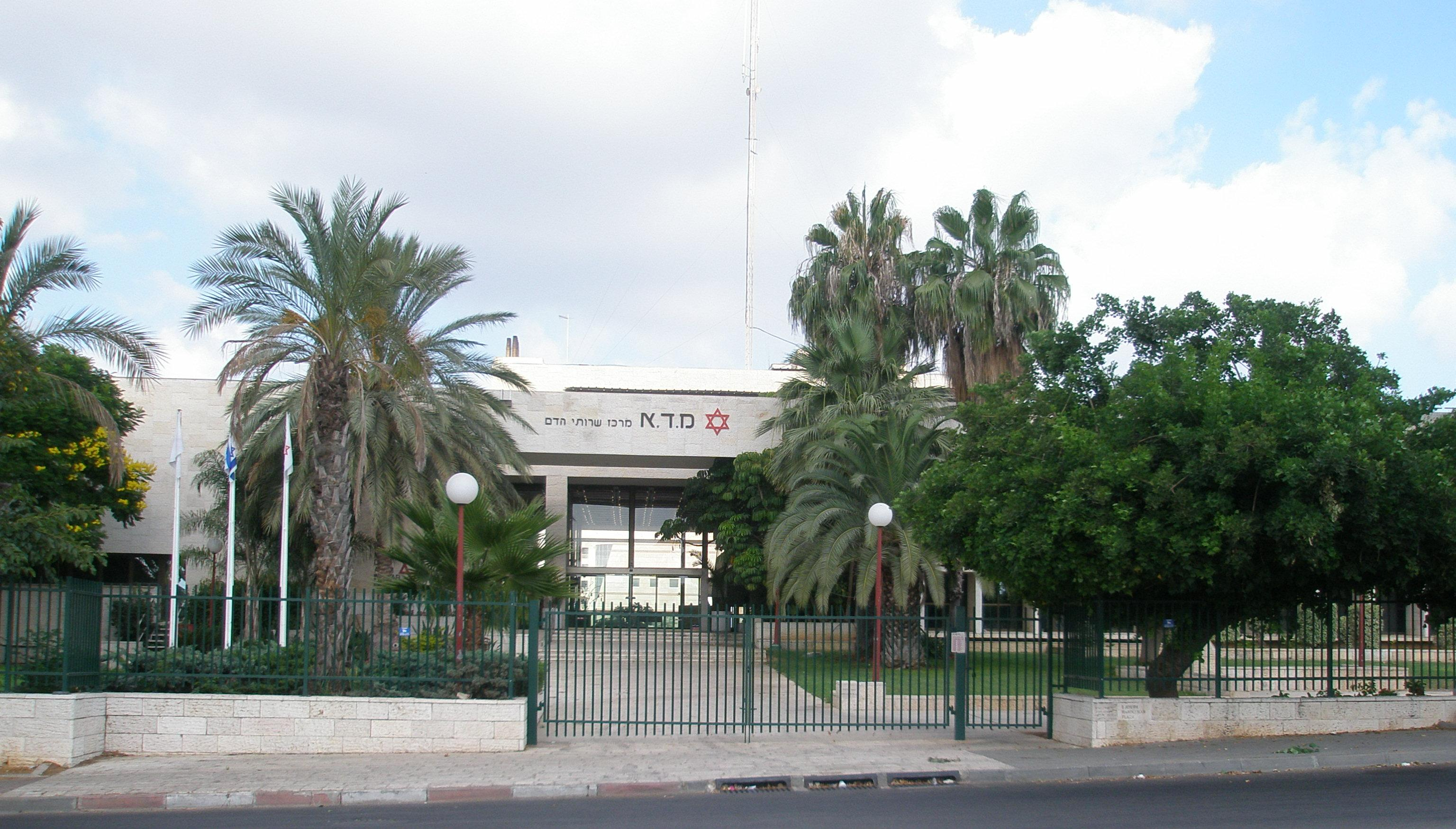
Blood bank

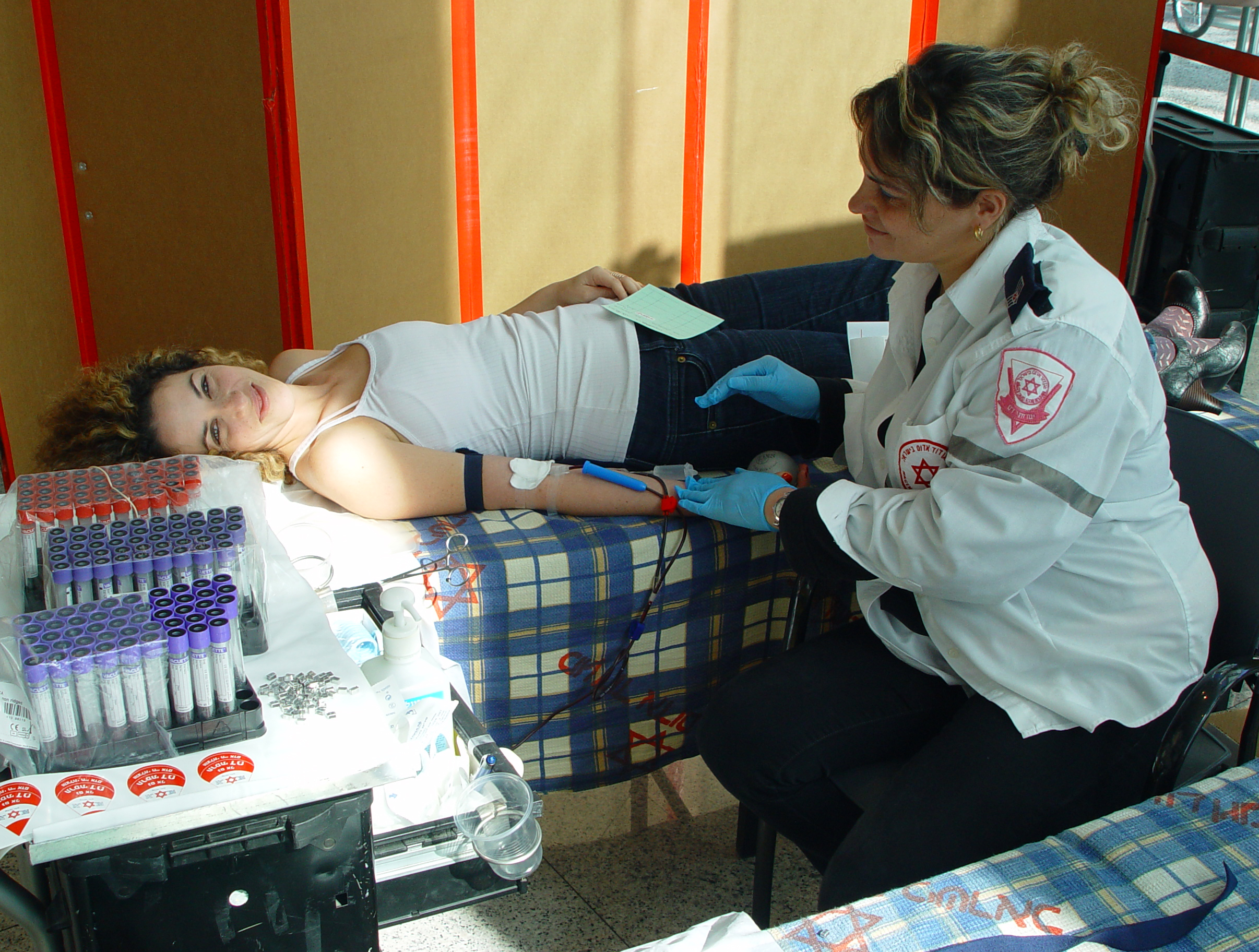
Blood donation in a shopping-center in Ramat Gan 2009

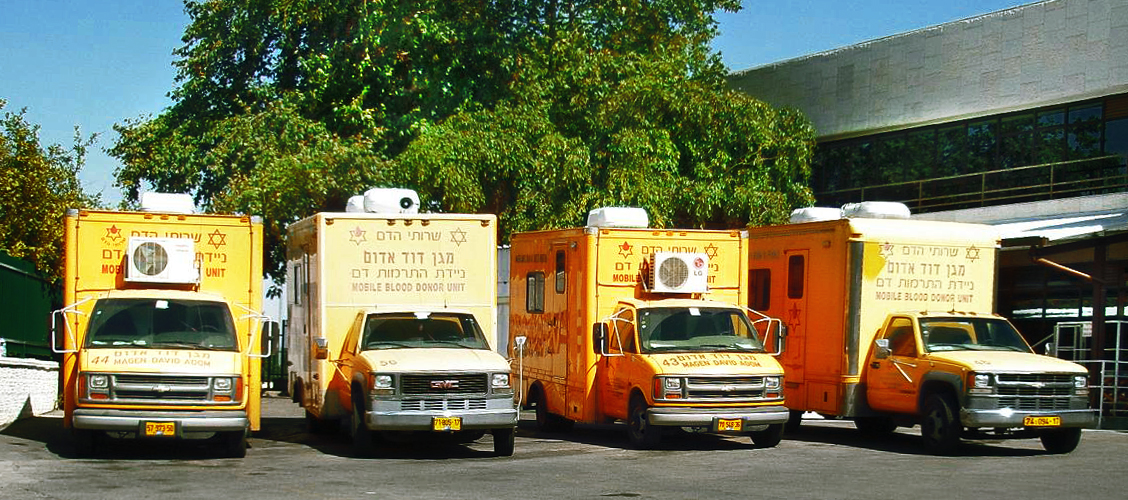
Mobile blood donor units

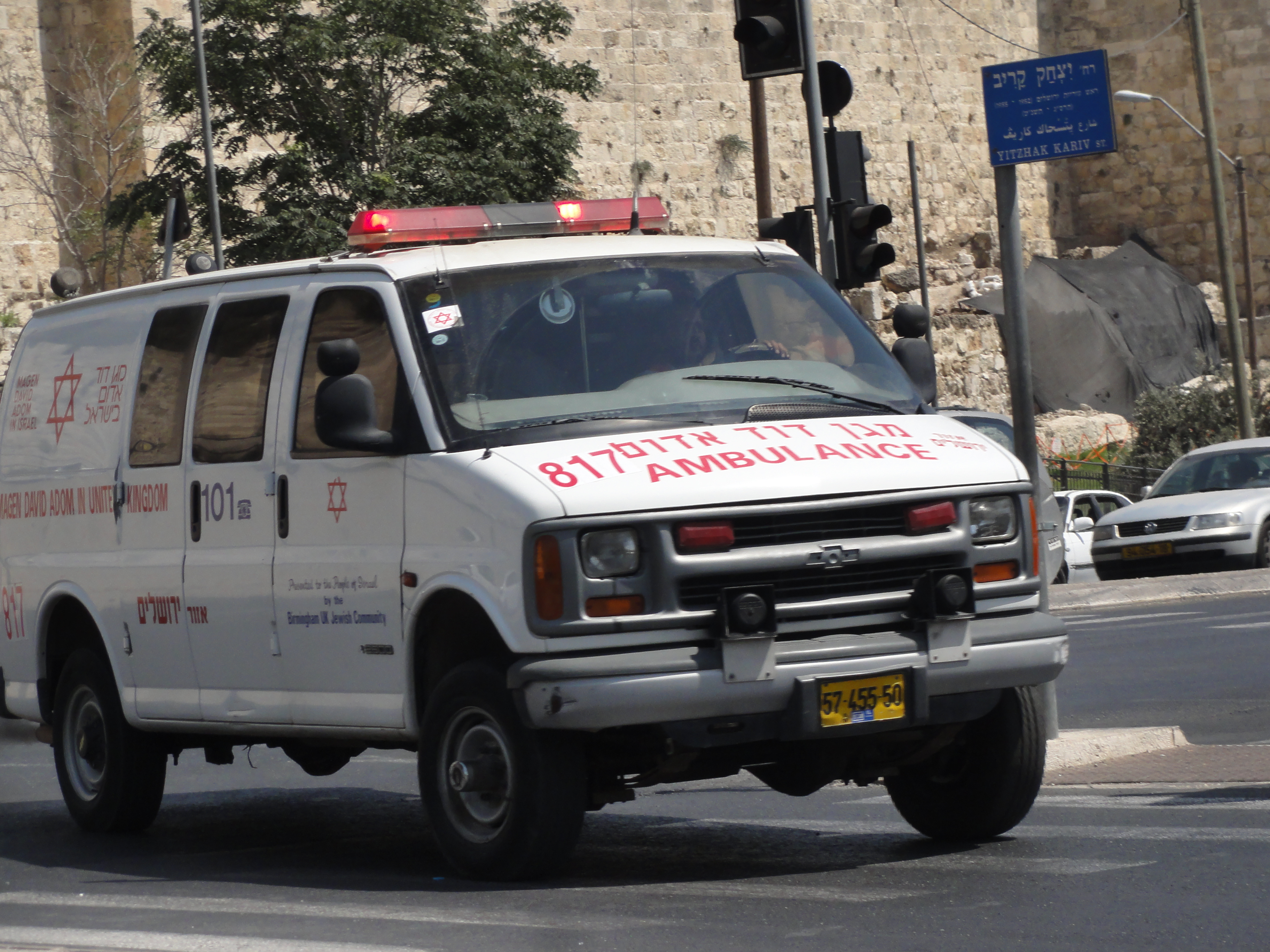
Standard MDA Basic Life Support Ambulance

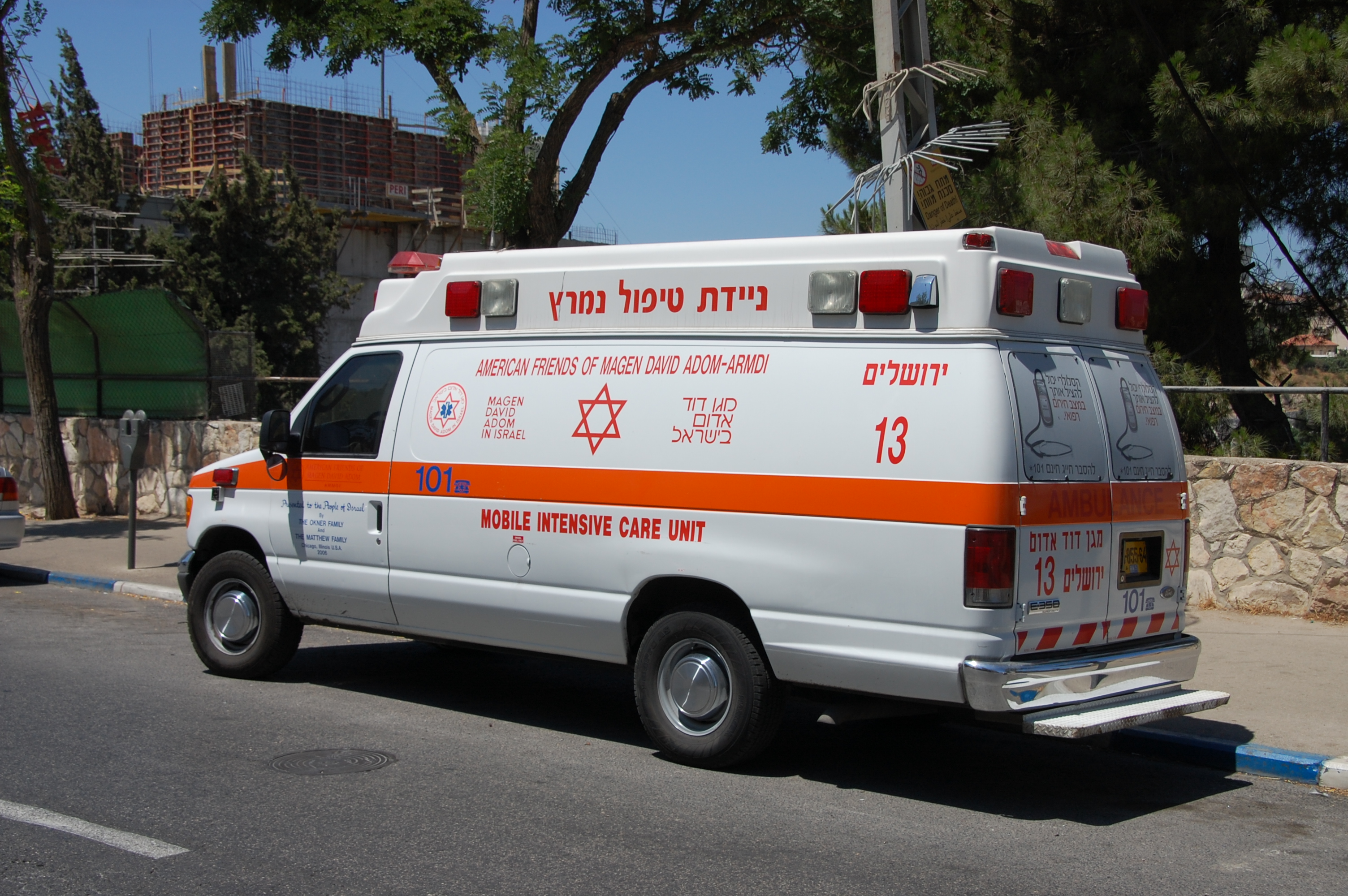
MDA Advance Life Support Ambulance

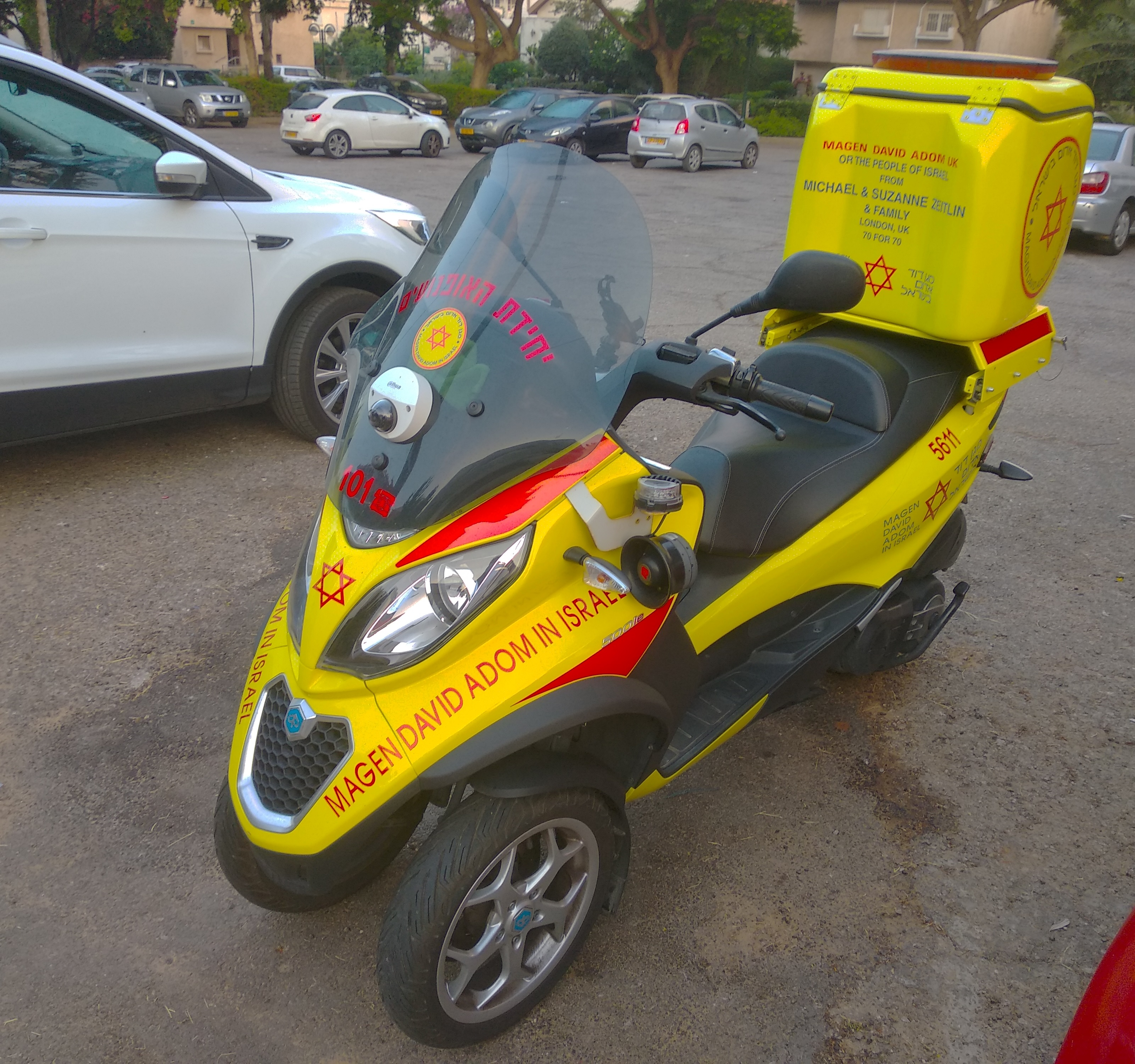
MDA Piaggio MP3 three-wheeled scooter

== See also ==
- Emergency medical services in Israel
- Hatzalah
- Healthcare in Israel
- Israel Fire and Rescue Services
- Medical Corps
- Protocol III, 2005 Geneva Convention amendment about the adoption of the Red Crystal emblem
- United Hatzalah
- ZAKA
