= Moshe Frenkel =

Founder of Magen David Adom

Moshe Frenkel (Hebrew: משה פרנקל; born 1897) was a founder of Magen David Adom, one of the founders and organizers of the Tel Aviv neighborhood of Neve Shaanan and the head of Tel Aviv municipality's tax division in its formative years in the early 20th century. Later in life he served as the chief treasurer of Magen David Adom.

== Biography ==
Moshe Frenkel was born in 1897 in Odesa, the Russian Empire (now Ukraine).

When Jewish refugees from the Land of Israel, in particular from Safed arrived in Odesa during the first world war, Frenkel was one of the heads of the local organization that assisted Jewish refugees. Frenkel along with his companions organized the return voyage of the refugees to the land of Israel. He and several other hundred local Jews joined the refugees on their voyage home on the SS Ruslan. In 1921 he married Esther Perman. During his time in Tel Aviv he founded two synagogues

In 1922 he was one of the founders of the Neve Shaanan neighborhood in Tel Aviv.

In 1926 he was the head of Tel Aviv's tax division.

In 1930, he was the right hand man of Moshe Levontin in founding Magen David Adom, the paramedic rescue organization. Frenkel went on to found the first state wide branch of Magen David Adom. Later in life he served as the chief accountant of Magen David Adom.

During the second world war, Frenkel was a director in the passive defense organization of Tel Aviv.
