= Human shield (law) =

Designation in humanitarian law

Human shields are legally protected persons—either protected civilians or prisoners of war—who are either coerced or volunteer to deter attacks by occupying the space between a belligerent and a legitimate military target. The use of human shields is forbidden by Protocol I of the Geneva Conventions. It is also a specific intent war crime as codified in the Rome Statute, which was adopted in 1998. The language of the Rome Statute of the International Criminal Court prohibits "utilizing the presence of a civilian or other protected person to render certain points, areas, or military forces immune from military operations".

Historically, the law of armed conflict only applied to sovereign states; non-international conflicts were governed by the domestic law of the state concerned. Under the current terms of the Rome Statute, the use of human shields is defined as a war crime only in the context of an international armed conflict.

After the end of World War II, non-international armed conflicts have become more commonplace. The Customary International Humanitarian Law guide suggests that rules prohibiting use of civilians as human shields are "arguably" customary in non-international armed conflict. The development and application of humanitarian law to modern asymmetric warfare is currently being debated by legal scholars.

== History ==
The laws of war are a crucial aspect of the history of human shields. This body of laws regulates the deployment of violence during armed conflict, but it is also an instrument that is used by warring parties to establish the legitimacy of power and the forms of humane violence. The laws of war first began to develop the distinction between military and civilian targets at the Second Hague Peace Conference of 1907.

During World War I, the concept of total war permitted most actions that supported the war effort. In "total war" targeting civilians was allowed, if it would support a military objective to demoralize the enemy. Indiscriminate bombing was considered an acceptable method to achieve the military advantage of defeating enemy morale and eroding popular support for the war effort. Early attempts to protect civilians as a class were largely unsuccessful. World War II was also fought within the framework of the total war concept.

The Geneva Conventions of 1949 were the first significant protections for civilians in war. These protections were expanded by the Additional Protocols in 1977. Protocol I requires that attacks be limited to military objectives, which are defined as targets that make an "effective contribution to military action" where the destruction of the target provides a "definite military advantage" to the attacker.

== Legal doctrine ==
Attacks shall be strictly limited to military objectives. In so far as objects are concerned, military objectives are limited to those objects which by their nature, location, purpose or use make an effective contribution to military action and whose total or partial destruction, capture or neutralization, in the circumstances ruling at the time, offers a definite military advantage.

— Protocol I, Geneva Conventions

Military necessity can justify the use of force in certain circumstances, where there is a military advantage to be gained by an attack. When the use of force is excessive relative to its anticipated military advantage, it is said to be disproportionate, which is prohibited under international law.

Risk to civilians does not bar military action, but the principle of proportionality requires that precautions be taken to minimize the harm to these protected persons. This analysis includes considerations like whether circumstances permit the attacker to time a military action to minimize the presence of civilians at the location.

Under the Rome Statute, using protected persons as shields in an international armed conflict is a war crime. There is currently debate amongst legal scholars about whether traditional proportionality analysis should be modified to take into account the culpability of actors who use human shields to gain a strategic advantage. In modern asymmetric warfare it has become difficult to distinguish between military targets and civilians, but State actors still rely on traditional principles that present challenges when applied to asymmetric conflicts. Non-state forces, like guerillas and terrorists, conceal themselves among civilian populations and may take advantage of this position to launch attacks. When military action targeting these unconventional combatants results in civilian deaths, State actors may blame the deaths on enemy forces who use human shields.

=== Proportionate proportionality analysis ===
Military necessity permits a belligerent, subject to the laws of war, to apply any amount and kind of force to compel the complete submission of the enemy with the least possible expenditure of time, life, and money ... it permits the destruction of life, of armed enemies and other persons whose destruction is incidentally unavoidable ... but does not permit the killing of innocent inhabitants for purposes of revenge or the satisfaction of a lust to kill.

— United States v. List

Some scholars, including Amnon Rubinstein and Yaniv Roznai, argue that the use of human shields should be a factor in determining whether the use of force was justifiable under the guiding principles of distinction and proportionality. In their view, the use of human shields undermines an attacker's right to self-defense because the military necessity of self-defense must be a consideration in the excessive force analysis. Rubinstein and Roznai have described this analysis as a "proportionate proportionality".

Rubinstein and Roznai argue that an attack that would be disproportionate ought to be considered proportionate, if the presence of civilians is due to the wrongful actions of the enemy. They use the term "impeded party" to describe the burden placed on the attacking party under international humanitarian law norms. They point out that "attacking party" has traditionally been synonymous with the aggressor, but that it is often the attacker who is "defending democracy" and acting in self-defense when they use force in response to a prior attack.

Douglas Fischer believes that the increase of civilian casualties that began with the Vietnam War is partially due to an increased use of "illegal and perfidious" tactics in modern warfare, including the use of civilians as human shields. He has criticized Human Rights Watch for not including human shields doctrine as a factor in excessive force analysis.

=== Voluntary and involuntary ===
Combatants in an international armed conflict are prohibited from using the presence of civilians or other protected persons as human shields to protect against or deter military operations.

Protected civilians who are used as involuntary human shields by unlawful combatants do not lose their basic rights. The use of involuntary human shields does not release the other party from legal obligations to not target protected civilians or inflict excessive collateral damage.

Voluntary human shields may be considered "direct participants in hostilities", if they shield targeted personnel or properties. This could also be considered treason. However, if they are shielding protected personnel or properties, they may still retain their protected status. This debated area of customary international law has not yet been codified.

The United States and the European Union are considered the main sources for voluntary human shields. In 2003, human rights activists travelled to Baghdad to serve as human shields and protest the unpopular U.S. invasion. Also in 2003, American peace activist Rachel Corrie was crushed to death by an Israeli army bulldozer in Rafah while volunteering with the International Solidarity Movement as a human shield to prevent the demolition of homes in Palestine.

=== Current limitations of International Humanitarian Law ===
While International Humanitarian Law (IHL) does prohibit attacks on protected civilians, the precautions that a power must take before an attack remain ill-defined. Proportionality remains a nebulous standard that does not set a predictable standard for when a military action against a human shield would be considered lawful. There is a lack of enforcement, and the increasing role of private actors and contractors on the battlefield presents additional challenges.

=== U.S. law ===
During the American Civil War, the United States adopted the Lieber Code, recognized by many scholars as the first detailed code governing conduct in war. Francis Lieber articulated an early version of the principle of proportionality: that civilians were not to be targeted, but were also not immune in all circumstances.

The use of human shields is prohibited and defined as a war crime by several U.S. military manuals. It is also defined as a crime triable by military commission under the Military Commissions Act of 2006.

== Modern warfare tactic ==
If the belligerent attacks in areas where human shields are used, this can weaken international and domestic support by exploiting harmed protected civilians. For nations that are particularly sensitive to collateral damage, an enemy's use of shields may effectively deter or delay military actions.

There have been numerous documented incidents where this tactic has not been successful in deterring attacks, including the Amiriyah shelter bombing during the First Gulf War. After the death of two Western activists serving as voluntary human shields in Gaza, Véronique Dudouet wrote that human shields have become less effective, since bad media publicity no longer deters soldiers from using lethal force against them.

In the 21st century, Palestinian militant groups such as Hamas have been accused of using the tactic, and Israel Defense Force soldiers have been filmed using Palestinian civilians as human shields. According to NATO research, the strategic use of human shields by groups like Hamas hinges on exploiting Israel's aim to minimize civilian casualties and the sensitivity of Western public opinion. This tactic allowed Hamas to either accuse Israel of war crimes if civilian casualties occur or to protect its assets and continue operations if the IDF limits its military response. This approach is an example of "lawfare", using legal and public platforms to challenge an adversary. In November 2023, Cambridge University Professor Marc Weller stated that "The very fact that we have seen 44 [Israeli] soldiers killed in the [Israeli invasion of the Gaza Strip] and almost 11,000 [Palestinian] civilians gives an indication that the calculation of proportionality in Gaza has left the bounds of reasonableness." There are also scholars arguing that deliberate civilian casualties in Gaza are later depicted as human shields by Israel. In this, Israel makes no distinction between voluntary and involuntary human shields. To reduce the number of civilian casualties, the IDF often uses the tactic of "roof knocking". However, this tactic has proven to be insufficient and is sometimes argued to be a purely legal strategy of the IDF, allowing it to efficiently label civilian casualties as human shields.
