= Indiscriminate attack =

Military attack that does not distinguish between military targets and civilian targets

In international humanitarian law, an indiscriminate attack is a military attack that fails to distinguish between legitimate military targets and protected persons. Indiscriminate attacks strike both legitimate military and protected objects alike, thus violating the principle of distinction between combatants and protected civilians. They differ from direct (or deliberate) attacks against protected civilians and encompass cases in which the perpetrators are indifferent as to the nature of the target, cases in which the perpetrators use tactics or weapons that are inherently indiscriminate (e.g., cluster munitions, anti-personnel mines, and nuclear weapons), and cases in which the attack is disproportionate, because it is likely to cause excessive protected civilian casualties and damages to protected objects.

Indiscriminate attacks are prohibited both by the Geneva Conventions Additional Protocol I (1977) and by customary international humanitarian law. They constitute a war crime under the Rome Statute of the International Criminal Court, and the perpetrators can be prosecuted and held responsible in international and domestic courts.

== Concept ==
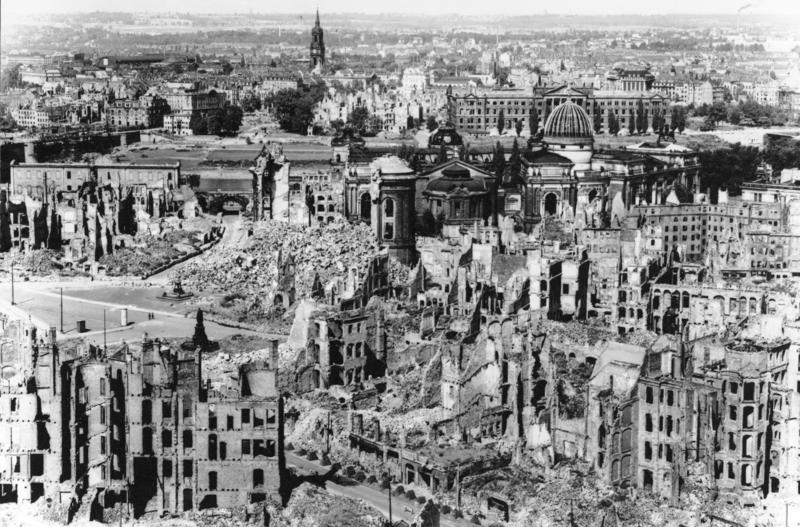
The Bombing of Dresden (13–15 February 1945) killed an estimated 25,000 people and is often regarded as a case of indiscriminate air attack.

Indiscriminate attacks are military attacks that neglect the distinction between legitimate military targets, on the one side, and persons and objects that enjoy protection under international humanitarian law, on the other. (See protected persons for more information.)

Protected persons and objects include civilians and civilian objects that do not make an effective contribution to military action and whose destruction does not offer a definite military advantage. Protected objects under international humanitarian law include also objects indispensable to the survival of the civilian population, cultural objects and places of worship, undefended towns, villages, dwellings, or building, works and installations containing dangerous forces, such as nuclear plants, dams and dikes, and the natural environment, which should not be exposed to widespread, long-term, and severe damage.

Indiscriminate attacks strike military objects and protected objects alike, thus violating the principle of distinction between combatants and protected civilians. (Note: Protocol Additional to the Geneva Conventions of 12 August 1949, and relating to the Protection of Victims of International Armed Conflicts (Protocol I), 8 June 1977. Article 48. Basic rule In order to ensure respect for and protection of the civilian population and civilian objects, the Parties to the conflict shall at all times distinguish between the civilian population and combatants and between civilian objects and military objectives and accordingly shall direct their operations only against military objectives.) Contrary to direct attacks against civilian objects, where the attacker is deliberately trying to hit a civilian object (e.g. to spread terror and break the morale of the population), indiscriminate attacks imply that the attacker is indifferent as to whether the targets are military or not and conducts the operation without regard for any effect it may have on the civilians. Essential to the notion of indiscriminate attack is the state of mind of the attacker, which must be assessed taking into account the so-called fog of war, that is, that the information available at the time of the attack might have been faulty or incomplete.

The notion of indiscriminate attack is defined in Article 51 Geneva Conventions Additional Protocol I (1977). (Note: Protocol Additional to the Geneva Conventions of 12 August 1949, and relating to the Protection of Victims of International Armed Conflicts (Protocol I), 8 June 1977. Article 51. Protection of the civilian population (...) 4. Indiscriminate attacks are prohibited. Indiscriminate attacks are: (a) those which are not directed at a specific military objective; (b) those which employ a method or means of combat which cannot be directed at a specific military objective; or (c) those which employ a method or means of combat the effects of which cannot be limited as required by this Protocol; and consequently, in each such case, are of a nature to strike military objectives and civilians or civilian objects without distinction. 5. Among others, the following types of attacks are to be considered as indiscriminate: (a) an attack by bombardment by any methods or means which treats as a single military objective a number of clearly separated and distinct military objectives located in a city, town, village or other area containing a similar concentration of civilians or civilian objects; and (b) an attack which may be expected to cause incidental loss of civilian life, injury to civilians, damage to civilian objects, or a combination thereof, which would be excessive in relation to the concrete and direct military advantage anticipated.) Indiscriminate attacks are engaged in by employing either tactics or weapons that are indiscriminate, and by launching attacks that are disproportionate.

Examples of the first kind include releasing bombs over enemy territory in the hope of incidentally striking a military objective, firing blindly without ensuring that the target is of military nature, conducting air strikes in situations of limited sight, launching an attack with imprecise weapons against a military objective that is closely surrounded by civilian objects, and using inherently indiscriminate weapons such as cluster munitions and anti-personnel landmines without taking necessary precautions. Also the use of nuclear weapons, while not being as such prohibited under current customary international law, will usually violate the ban on indiscriminate attacks.

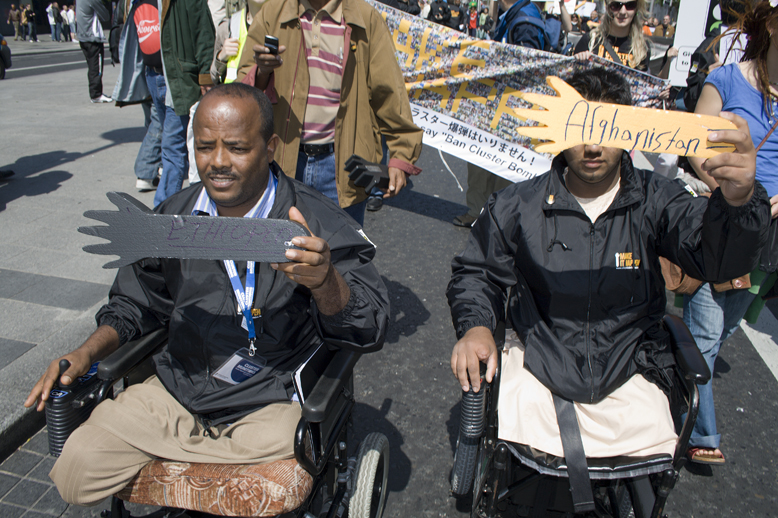
Demonstrators at the May 2008 Dublin Diplomatic Conference on Cluster Munitions that produced the Convention on Cluster Munitions.

Indiscriminate attacks also include attacks that violate the proportionality rule: the so-called disproportionate attacks. Until the adoption of Protocol I, once an attack was aimed at a military objective, any inevitable harm caused to protected civilians and civilian objects during hostilities was accepted as "collateral damage". Under current international humanitarian law, however, attacks against a legitimate military objective that lead to collateral damages are subject to the principle of proportionality: losses to the civilian population and damage to civilian objects must not be "excessive in relation to the concrete and direct military advantage anticipated" from the attack, as stated in Article 51 Protocol I. This basic principle is expressed also in Article 57. (Note: Protocol Additional to the Geneva Conventions of 12 August 1949, and relating to the Protection of Victims of International Armed Conflicts (Protocol I), 8 June 1977. Article 57. Precautions in attack (...) 2. With respect to attacks, the following precautions shall be taken: (a) those who plan or decide upon an attack shall: (...) (ii) take all feasible precautions in the choice of means and methods of attack with a view to avoiding, and in any event to minimizing, incidental loss of civilian life, injury to civilians and damage to civilian objects; (iii) refrain from deciding to launch any attack which may be expected to cause incidental loss of civilian life, injury to civilians, damage to civilian objects, or a combination thereof, which would be excessive in relation to the concrete and direct military advantage anticipated; (b) an attack shall be cancelled or suspended if it becomes apparent that the objective is not a military one or is subject to special protection or that the attack may be expected to cause incidental loss of civilian life, injury to civilians, damage to civilian objects, or a combination thereof, which would be excessive in relation to the concrete and direct military advantage anticipated; 3. When a choice is possible between several military objectives for obtaining a similar military advantage, the objective to be selected shall be that the attack on which may be expected to cause the least danger to civilian lives and to civilian objects.)

It can be difficult to retrospectively evaluate decisions that balance the expected military advantage against the collateral loss of civilian lives, which partly explains why prosecutions before national and international criminal courts for wartime attacks on civilians are scarce and difficult, as has been noted by several authors.

== Legal status in international and national law ==
The prohibition of indiscriminate attacks is set forth in Article 51(4) and (5) of Additional Protocol I and is generally considered a norm of customary international humanitarian law. While Protocol I is applicable only in international armed conflict and only to the signatory states of that international treaty, the prohibition of indiscriminate attacks as a rule of customary international humanitarian law is applicable in both international and non-international armed conflicts (civil wars) and is also applicable to states that are not party to Additional Protocol I, such as India and the United States. The prohibition of indiscriminate attacks can also be construed as a necessary consequence of the principle of distinction between combatants and civilians. The principle of distinction belongs to customary international humanitarian law and justifies a number of analogous rules including prohibitions or limitations on starvation, sieges, and reprisals against civilians, civilian objects, and other protected persons and objects.

The prohibition of indiscriminate attacks is established in numerous national military manuals as well as supported by official statements and reported practice; to carry out such attacks is a criminal offense under the legislation of several countries

Indiscriminate attacks in international armed conflicts are also defined and punished as a war crime under the Rome Statute of the International Criminal Court. (Note: Rome Statute of the International Criminal Court, adopted 17 July 1998, entered in to force 1 July 2002. Article 8. War crimes (...): 2. For the purpose of this Statute, "war crimes" means:(...); (b) (...) (iv) Intentionally launching an attack in the knowledge that such attack will cause incidental loss of life or injury to civilians or damage to civilian objects or widespread, long-term and severe damage to the natural environment which would be clearly excessive in relation to the concrete and direct overall military advantage anticipated; (...) (xx) Employing weapons, projectiles and material and methods of warfare which are of a nature to cause superfluous injury or unnecessary suffering or which are inherently indiscriminate in violation of the international law of armed conflict, provided that such weapons, projectiles and material and methods of warfare are the subject of a comprehensive prohibition and are included in an annex to this Statute, by an amendment in accordance with the relevant provisions set forth in articles 121 and 123; (...))

== History ==
=== Before World War II ===
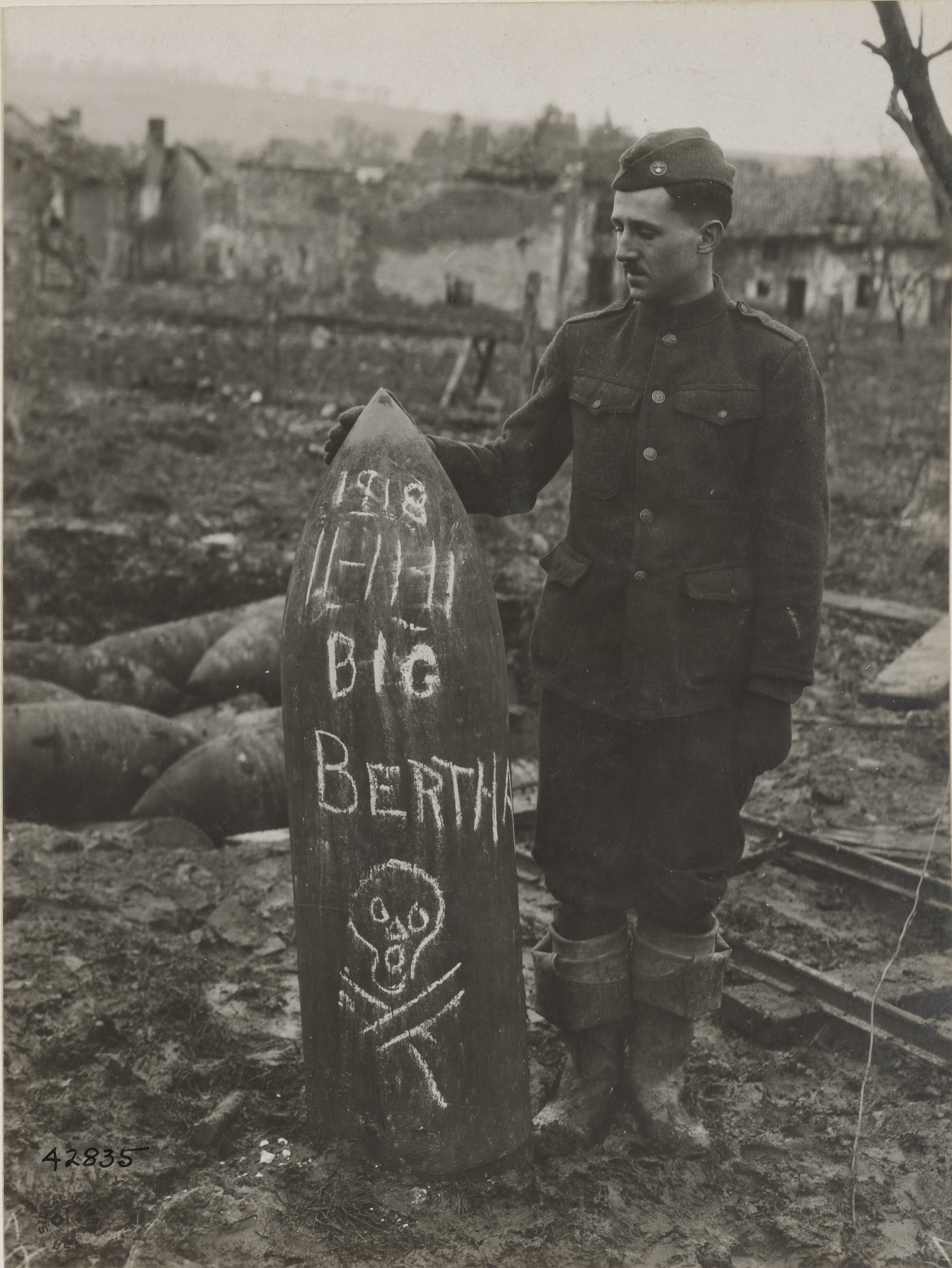
Big Bertha. Shells for the 42 cm guns were generally 1.5 m long and weighed between 400 and 1,160 kg.

The reasons behind the prohibition of indiscriminate attacks were already spelled out by one of the founders of international law, Francisco de Vitoria. A passage of his "Second Relectio on the Indians, or on the Law of War" (1532) can be read as an anticipation of the modern principle of proportionality:

[If] little effect upon the ultimate issue of the war is to be expected from the storming of a fortress (...) wherein are many innocent folk, it would not be right, for the purpose of assailing a few guilty, to slay the many innocent by use of fire or engines of war or other means likely to overwhelm indifferently both innocent and guilty.

— Francisco de Vitoria, De Indis De Jure Belli, Part 3

The first attempt at codifying a general prohibition of indiscriminate attacks were the 1923 Hague Rules of Air Warfare, which never came into force. They were drafted under the impression of World War I, where recourse to aerial bombing of cities had first become widespread. Strategic bombing by German forces using airships (such as the Zeppelin raids over England and during the siege of Antwerp) and long-range artillery (the "Big Bertha" cannon) raised the issue of how to contain indiscriminate military attacks. The Hague Rules proposed that in cases where the military targets "are so situated, that they cannot be bombarded without the indiscriminate bombardment of the civilian population, the aircraft must abstain from bombardment." While supported by United States and Japan, the Hague Rules were rejected by France and the United Kingdom. At the 1932 World Disarmament Conference, the British government argued that limitations to aerial warfare should not apply to colonies: as former Prime Minister David Lloyd George declared, "we insisted on reserving the right to bomb niggers".

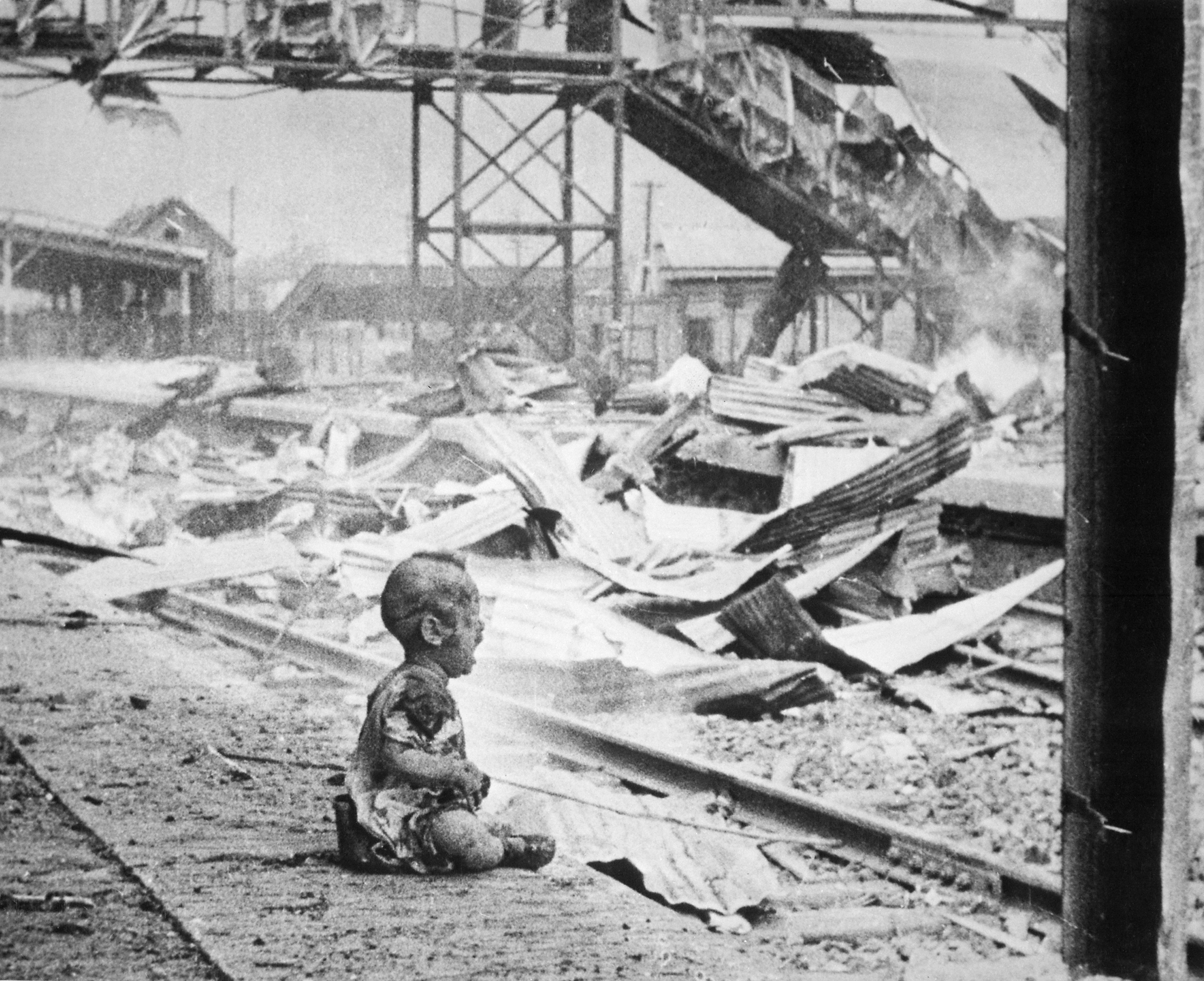
The photo Bloody Saturday shows a burned and terrified baby following an aerial attack on 28 August 1937 during the Battle of Shanghai.

Before World War II, the deadliest indiscriminate attacks occurred outside Europe, in the Italian invasion of Ethiopia (1935-1936) and in the Japanese invasion of Manchuria (1931-1932) and China (1937-1945). However, it was only with the Spanish Civil War (1936-1939), as consequence of the bombing of Madrid, Guernica and other cities, that indiscriminate bombing of civilian populations first came to the attention of Western audiences. Notwithstanding the efforts by the ICRC and the drafting of the 1938 Convention for the Protection of Civilian Populations Against New Engines of War, which never became legally binding, World War II broke out in the absence of an international regime prohibiting indiscriminate attacks.

The basic provision limiting aerial warfare was set forth in the 1907 Fourth Hague Convention, and forbade any bombardment of undefended towns, but allowed bombardment of defended towns, or towns that were under attack on the ground. According to international law of the time, "indiscriminate bombing of a defended city or a defended area [was] permissible", as the District Court of Tokyo exposed in Ryuichi Shimoda v. The State (1963). As British Prime Minister Neville Chamberlain stated to the House of Commons of the United Kingdom in June 1938: there was "no international code of law with respect to aerial warfare which is the subject of general agreement."

=== World War II and aftermath ===
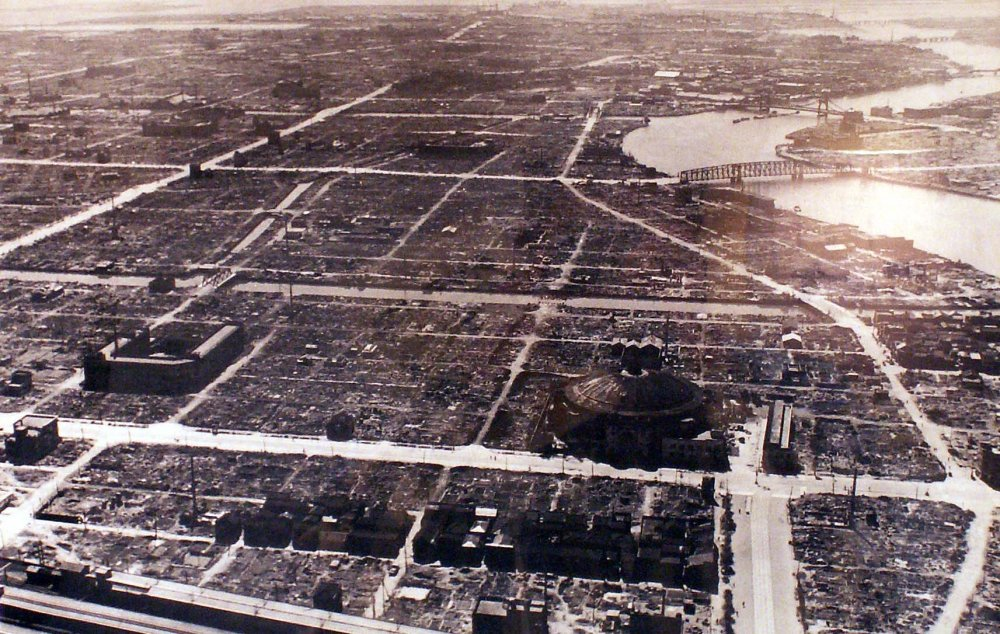
The bombing of Tokyo in March 1945 was the single deadliest air raid of World War II leaving an estimated 100,000 civilians dead and over one million homeless.

At the onset of the war, U.S. President Franklin D. Roosevelt attempted to mitigate this situation by launching an Appeal to the Belligerents to Refrain from the Bombing of Open Towns. The appeal was accepted by the German, French and British governments and proved to be quite effective in practice, as during World War II it remained an option to declare a city "open", abandon all defensive efforts and avoid bombing, as happened in Paris, Brussels, Rome, Athens and elsewhere.

The vast majority of cities were defended and subjected to heavy fire during the war; Heinrich Himmler declared that "No German city will be declared an open city" and hundreds of thousands of civilians died as consequence of massive bombing during the six years of the conflict. From the start, Allied policy was conditioned upon Axis observance of the norm of reciprocity. "Reprisals" could lawfully follow any belligerent's bombardment of civilians, which was the legal ramification of the norm of reciprocity", and with the indiscriminate attacks by German forces against Polish targets during the invasion of Poland that began in September 1939 the norm of reciprocity "was the only guarantor of a fighting chance at survival in the face of an enemy who disregarded important humanitarian principles".

Both the Allied and Axis powers carried out carpet bombings during the war, such as the attacks on Wieluń, Rotterdam, Warsaw, London, Coventry and on Shanghai and Chongqing, on the one side, and the attacks on Cologne, Berlin, Hamburg, Dresden and on several Japanese cities including Tokyo, on the other. Under current international humanitarian law, most of these bombings would probably qualify as deliberate attacks on civilians rather than as indiscriminate attacks, as they were conducted with the explicit intention of targeting "morale".

In the last 12 months of the war, Germany introduced the paradigmatic case of indiscriminate weapon: the so-called "flying bombs" or "V-weapons" (V-1 flying bomb, V-2 rockets and V-3 cannon). These long-range ballistic missiles could not be directed at a specific military objective but were pointed in the general direction of large metropolitan areas; they "could hardly hit a particular city, let alone a specific point within them". Equally indiscriminate but less effective were the Japanese Fu-Go incendiary balloons – the first intercontinental weapon. The deadliest indiscriminate weapons used during World War II were by far the atomic bombs detonated by the United States over Hiroshima and Nagasaki.

After the war, the German and Japanese leaderships were not pursued for deliberate and indiscriminate air attacks on the civilian populations. Their bombing campaigns had arguably been paralleled or surpassed by those carried out by the Allies, and in the Nuremberg and Tokyo indictments no attempt was made to frame indiscriminate attacks as war crimes. During the negotiations of the 1949 Geneva Conventions, protection of civilians was a controversial subject, and the British representatives opposed any restriction to the freedom to carry out bombing – at the time, both France and the United Kingdom were engaged in "aerial policing" as part of counterinsurgency efforts in their colonial empires. As a result, the conventions left out the guidelines for the protection of civilians from the effect of hostilities in international conflicts while Common Article 3 provides protection only to the moment the person is under the physical control of a party to a non-international conflict.

Between 1945 and 1977, Western nations carried out intensive bombing campaigns as part of counterinsurgencies in the Global South. These included France in Madagascar during the Malagasy Uprising and Algeria during the Algerian War, the United Kingdom in Malaya during the Malayan Emergency and Kenya during the Mau Mau rebellion and the United States in Korea during the Korean War and Vietnam during the Vietnam War.

=== The 1977 Additional Protocols to the Geneva Conventions ===
==== Additional Protocol I ====
A general prohibition of indiscriminate attack in international conflicts was established in the 1977 Additional Protocol I:

- Article 51(4): Indiscriminate attacks are prohibited. Indiscriminate attacks are:
    - (a) Those which are not directed at a specific military objective;
    - (b) Those which employ a method or means of combat which cannot be directed at a specific military objective;
    - (c) Those which employ a method or means of combat [that] strike military objectives and civilians or civilian objects without distinction.
- Article 51(5): Among others, the following types of attacks are to be considered as indiscriminate:
  - (a) An attack by bombardment by any methods or means which treats as a single military objective a number of clearly separated and distinct military objectives; … and
  - (b) An attack which may be expected to cause incidental loss of civilian life, injury to civilians, damage to civilian objects, or a combination thereof, which would be excessive in relation to the concrete and direct military advantage anticipated.

During the diplomatic conference for the drafting of Additional Protocol I, the possibility was referred to of distinguishing the rules applicable to the aggressor from the rules applicable to the victim of the aggression, but several delegations opposed the proposal, which was eventually rejected by the conference. The diplomatic conference attached great importance to the prohibitions of deliberate and indiscriminate attacks on civilians set forth in Article 51, as is shown by the fact that Article 51 is one of the provisions to which no reservations can be made, and by the fact that its violation is qualified as a "grave breach" amounting to a war crime under Article 85.

As of 2022, Additional Protocol I has been ratified by 174 states, with the notable exceptions of India, Iran, Israel, Pakistan, Thailand and the United States. However, the practice of indiscriminate attack in international conflicts continued during the Indonesian occupation of East Timor (1975-1999) and the Palestinian rocket attacks on Israel as part of the Arab–Israeli conflict. Indiscriminate attacks, and occasionally also deliberate attacks on civilians, were particularly deadly during the Soviet-Afghanistan war, in the "war of the cities" (1984-1988) during the Iran-Iraq war, and in the first Nagorno-Karabakh war between Armenia and Azerbaijan.

==== Additional Protocol II ====
Unlike Additional Protocol I, there is no explicit provision in Additional Protocol II spelling out the distinction between civilians and combatants during hostilities nor prohibiting indiscriminate attacks in non-international conflicts. However, Article 13 of Protocol II does state that civilians are entitled to protection "against the dangers arising from military operations", which is construed as indirectly banning indiscriminate attacks.

As of November 2023, Additional Protocol II had been ratified by 169 countries, with the United States, India, Pakistan, Turkey, Iran, Iraq, Syria, and Israel being notable exceptions. However, the United States, Iran, and Pakistan signed it on 12 December 1977, which signifies an intention to work towards ratifying it. The Iranian signature was given prior to the 1979 Iranian Revolution. In the 1980s and 1990s, indiscriminate attacks were recorded in non-international conflicts in the bombing of Lebanon in July 1981 and the siege of Beirut in 1982 during the Lebanese Civil War, Salvadoran Civil War (1979-1992), battle of Kabul during the Afghan Civil War (1992–1996), and in the first and second Chechen war, with the devastating sieges of Grozny in 1994-1995 and 1999-2000.

=== From the Gulf War onwards ===
The 1991 Gulf War and the wars of the former Yugoslavia, including Kosovo, have been regarded as the first attempts to avoid indiscriminate damage in the operations of war; the use of smart bombs was instrumental to that end. Although bombings during the Gulf War destroyed critical infrastructures in Iraq leading to thousands of civilian deaths, the war was widely celebrated for the "most discriminate air campaign in history", with relatively few Iraqi civilians (around 3,000) directly killed by the bombings.

At the time of the Gulf War, many legal scholars doubted that Additional Protocol I codified customary international humanitarian law and was therefore binding upon the United States, which had not signed the convention. Human Rights Watch published a report arguing that "many of the Protocol’s provisions", including the prohibition of disproportionate and other indiscriminate attacks, "reaffirm, clarify or otherwise codify pre-existing customary law restraints on methods and means of combat and, thus, are binding on all nations regardless of ratification".

The 2009 Gaza war marked by indiscriminate use of rockets by the Palestinians and by indiscriminate airstrikes from the Israeli Defence Forces, as documented in the UN Goldstone report.

Indiscriminate attacks have been documented in the Syrian civil war by foreign soldiers from Russia and Turkey. Syrian government forces have also been accused of carrying out indiscriminate attacks in Idlib, Aleppo and other areas. Human rights groups have claimed that the Syrian Armed Forces are responsible for a systematic campaign of indiscriminate attacks in cities all across the country.

During the 2022 Russian invasion of Ukraine, Russia has repeatedly carried out indiscriminate attacks in densely populated areas.

In the context of the Gaza war, Amnesty International has documented indiscriminate attacks by the Israeli forces on Gaza, which it says have caused mass civilian casualties and should be investigated as war crimes. A group of independent United Nations experts also stated that Israel had resorted to indiscriminate attacks against the Palestinian population of Gaza.

The United States 2025 airstrike on a migrant detention centre in Saada, Yemen "amounted to an indiscriminate attack" according to Amnesty International.

== Bibliography ==
- Alexander, Amanda (2015). "A Short History of International Humanitarian Law". European Journal of International Law. 26 (1). Oxford University Press (OUP): 109–138. doi:10.1093/ejil/chv002. ISSN 0938-5428.
- Ambos, Kai (2014). Treatise on international criminal law. Vol. 2. Oxford, United Kingdom: Oxford University Press. ISBN 978-0-19-965792-6. OCLC 810946816.
- Bell, Christine; Pfeiffer, Julia (March 2011). "Indiscriminate Attack". Max Planck Encyclopedia of International Public Law.
- Bennett, John (2019). "Reaping the Whirlwind: The Norm of Reciprocity and the Law of Aerial Bombardment during World War II" (PDF). Melbourne Journal of International Law. 20: 1–44.
- Dinstein, Yoram (2004). The Conduct of Hostilities under the Law of International Armed Conflict. Cambridge University Press. ISBN 978-0-521-54227-2.
- Gillespie, Alexander (2011a). A history of the laws of war. Vol. 2, The customs and laws of war with regards to civilians in times of conflict. Oxford, UK: Hart Publishing. ISBN 978-1-84731-840-4. OCLC 785775730.
- Gillespie, Alexander (2011b). A History of the Laws of War. Vol. 3, The customs and laws of war with regards to arms control. Oxford, UK: Hart Publishing. ISBN 978-1-84946-206-8.
- Heller, Kevin Jon (2011). The Nuremberg Military Tribunals and the origins of international criminal law. Oxford: Oxford University Press. ISBN 978-0-19-172862-4. OCLC 757401636.
- Jochnick, Chris af; Normand, Roger (2017). "The Legitimation of Violence: A Critical History of the Laws of War". The Development and Principles of International Humanitarian Law. Routledge. pp. 49–95. doi:10.4324/9781315086767-2. ISBN 9781315086767.
- Jones, Craig (2020). The war lawyers: The United States, Israel, and juridical warfare. Oxford, United Kingdom: Oxford University Press. ISBN 978-0-19-884292-7. OCLC 1154072941.
- Lindqvist, Sven (2002). A history of bombing. London: Granta Books. ISBN 1-86207-490-9. OCLC 59399171.
- Moneta, Francesco (2015). "Disproportionate Attacks in International Criminal Law". The Protection of Non-Combatants During Armed Conflict and Safeguarding the Rights of Victims in Post-Conflict Society. Brill-Nijhoff. pp. 261–296. doi:10.1163/9789004236592_012. ISBN 9789004236592.
- Newman, Robert P. (1995). Truman and the Hiroshima cult. East Lansing: Michigan State University. ISBN 978-0-87013-940-6. OCLC 604119024.
- Pilloud, Claude; Sandoz, Yves; Swinarski, Christophe; Zimmermann, Bruno (1987). Commentary on the additional protocols of 8 June 1977 to the Geneva Conventions of 12 August 1949. Geneva: International Committee of the Red Cross. ISBN 90-247-3460-6. OCLC 17619946.
- Ponti, Christian (2015-05-04). "The Crime of Indiscriminate Attack and Unlawful Conventional Weapons: The Legacy of the icty Jurisprudence". Journal of International Humanitarian Legal Studies. 6 (1): 118–146. doi:10.1163/18781527-00601007. ISSN 1878-1373.
- Sabel, Robbie (2010). "The Legality of Reciprocity in the War against Terrorism". Case Western Reserve Journal of International Law. 43 (1–2): 473-482.
- Sassòli, Marco (2019). International humanitarian law: rules, controversies, and solutions to problems arising in warfare. Cheltenham, UK: Edward Elgar Publishing. ISBN 978-1-78643-854-6. OCLC 1076500614.
- Schmitt, Michael N. (2014). "Air Warfare". In Clapham, Andrew; Gaeta, Paola (eds.). The Oxford handbook of international law in armed conflict. Oxford, United Kingdom: Oxford University Press. pp. 118–144. doi:10.1093/law/9780199559695.003.0006. ISBN 978-0-19-955969-5. OCLC 869726495.
- Schmitt, Michael N. (2020). "International Humanitarian Law and the Conduct of Hostilities". In Saul, Ben; Akande, Dapo (eds.). The Oxford guide to international humanitarian law. Oxford, United Kingdom: Oxford University Press. pp. 147–174. ISBN 978-0-19-259748-9. OCLC 1153294179.
- Shue, Henry (2016). "Proportionality in War". Fighting Hurt: Rule and Exception in Torture and War. Oxford University Press. pp. 318–329. doi:10.1093/acprof:oso/9780198767626.003.0016. ISBN 978-0-19-876762-6.
- Solis, Gary D. (2010). The law of armed conflict: international humanitarian law in war. Cambridge [Eng]: Cambridge University Press. ISBN 978-0-521-87088-7. OCLC 423389334.
- Vail, Christopher (2017). "The legality of nuclear weapons for use and deterrence" (PDF). Georgetown Journal of International Law. 48 (3): 839–872.
- Werle, Gerhard; Jessberger, Florian (2020). Principles of international criminal law. Oxford, United Kingdom: Oxford University Press. ISBN 978-0-19-882685-9. OCLC 1153298354.
- Wilt, Harmen van der (2019). "Towards a Better Understanding of the Concept of 'Indiscriminate Attack'—How International Criminal Law Can Be of Assistance". Yearbook of International Humanitarian Law. Vol. 22. The Hague: T.M.C. Asser Press. pp. 29–42. doi:10.1007/978-94-6265-399-3_2. ISBN 978-94-6265-398-6. ISSN 1389-1359. S2CID 228874070.
