= Legitimate military target =

Target deemed valid for attack by belligerent

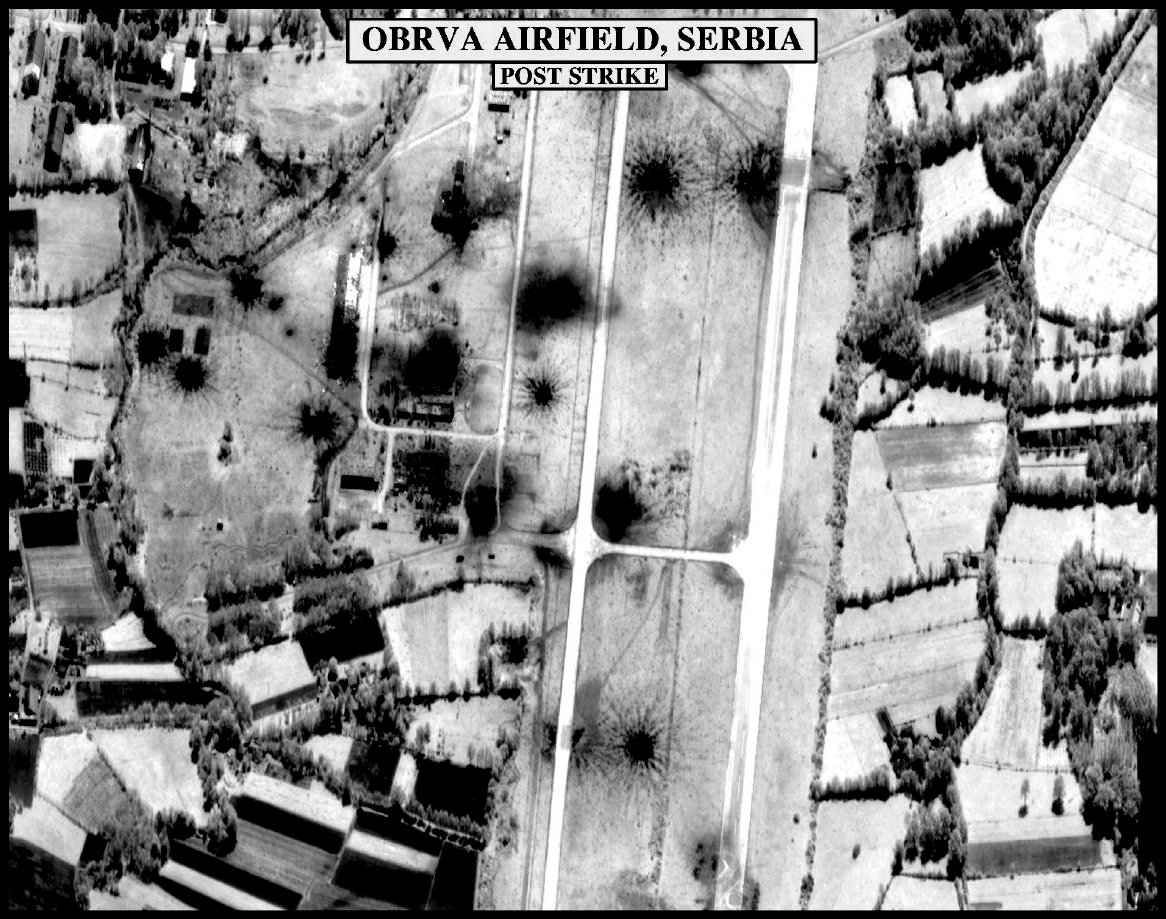
Post-strike bomb damage assessment photograph of Obrva Airfield, Serbia used in a Pentagon press briefing, May 5, 1999

A legitimate military target is an object, structure, individual, or entity that is considered to be a valid target for attack by belligerent forces according to the law of war during an armed conflict.

== Overview ==
Additional Protocol I of 1977 to the 1949 Geneva Conventions provides for the general protection of protected persons by limiting direct attacks to military objectives in a war between two or more belligerents. "With respect to the conduct of military operations, perhaps the most fundamental principle is the principle of distinction: belligerents are required to distinguish between military objectives and the [civilian] population and [civilian] objects, and to 'direct their operations only against military objectives.'"

The term military objectives includes combatants (whether on or off duty) as well as military objects:

In so far as objects are concerned, military objectives are limited to those objects which by their nature, location, purpose or use make an effective contribution to military action and whose total or partial destruction, capture or neutralization, in the circumstances ruling at the time, offers a definite military advantage.

Under international humanitarian law applicable to international armed conflicts, combatants are persons who fall into the following categories:

1. Members of the armed forces of a Party to the conflict as well as members of militias or volunteer corps forming part of such armed forces.
2. Members of other militias and members of other volunteer corps, including those of organized resistance movements, belonging to a Party to the conflict and operating in or outside their own territory, even if this territory is occupied, provided that such militias or volunteer corps, including such organized resistance movements, fulfil the following conditions:
  - that of being commanded by a person responsible for his subordinates;
  - that of having a fixed distinctive sign recognizable at a distance;
  - that of carrying arms openly;
  - that of conducting their operations in accordance with the laws and customs of war.
3. Members of regular armed forces who profess allegiance to a government or an authority not recognized by the Detaining Power.

Guerrilla and national liberation fighters were added as categories of combatants by Article 43 of Protocol I.

Any attack must be justified by military necessity: an attack or action must be intended to help in the military defeat of the enemy, it must be an attack on a military objective, and the harm caused to protected civilians or civilian property must be proportionate and not "excessive in relation to the concrete and direct military advantage anticipated".

Some targets are clearly legitimate, including all military personnel directly engaging in hostilities on behalf of a belligerent party who are not hors de combat or are not members of a neutral country. Some civilian infrastructure, such as rail tracks, roads, ports, airports, and telecommunications used by the military for communications or transporting assets, are all considered to be legitimate military targets.

The legal situation becomes more nuanced and ambiguous if the harm to civilians or civilian property is "excessive in relation to the concrete and direct military advantage anticipated". During World War II, there was a song called a thing-ummy-bob, which contains the lines "And it's the girl that makes the thing that holds the oil, that oils the ring that works the thing-ummy-bob, that's going to win the war". Whether such a girl is a legitimate target is an area that probably has to be decided on a case-by-case basis. However, Protocol I suggests that if it is not clear, then the parties to the conflict should err on the side of caution, as Article 52 states: "In case of doubt whether an object which is normally dedicated to civilian purposes, such as a place of worship, a house, or other dwelling or a school, is being used to make an effective contribution to military action, it shall be presumed not to be so used".

== See also ==
- Distinction (law)
- Non-combatant
- Civilian
- Indiscriminate attack
- Law of war (also known as international humanitarian law)
- Military necessity
- Proportionality (law)
- Civilian casualty rate
