= Collateral damage =

Unintended consequences done to third parties

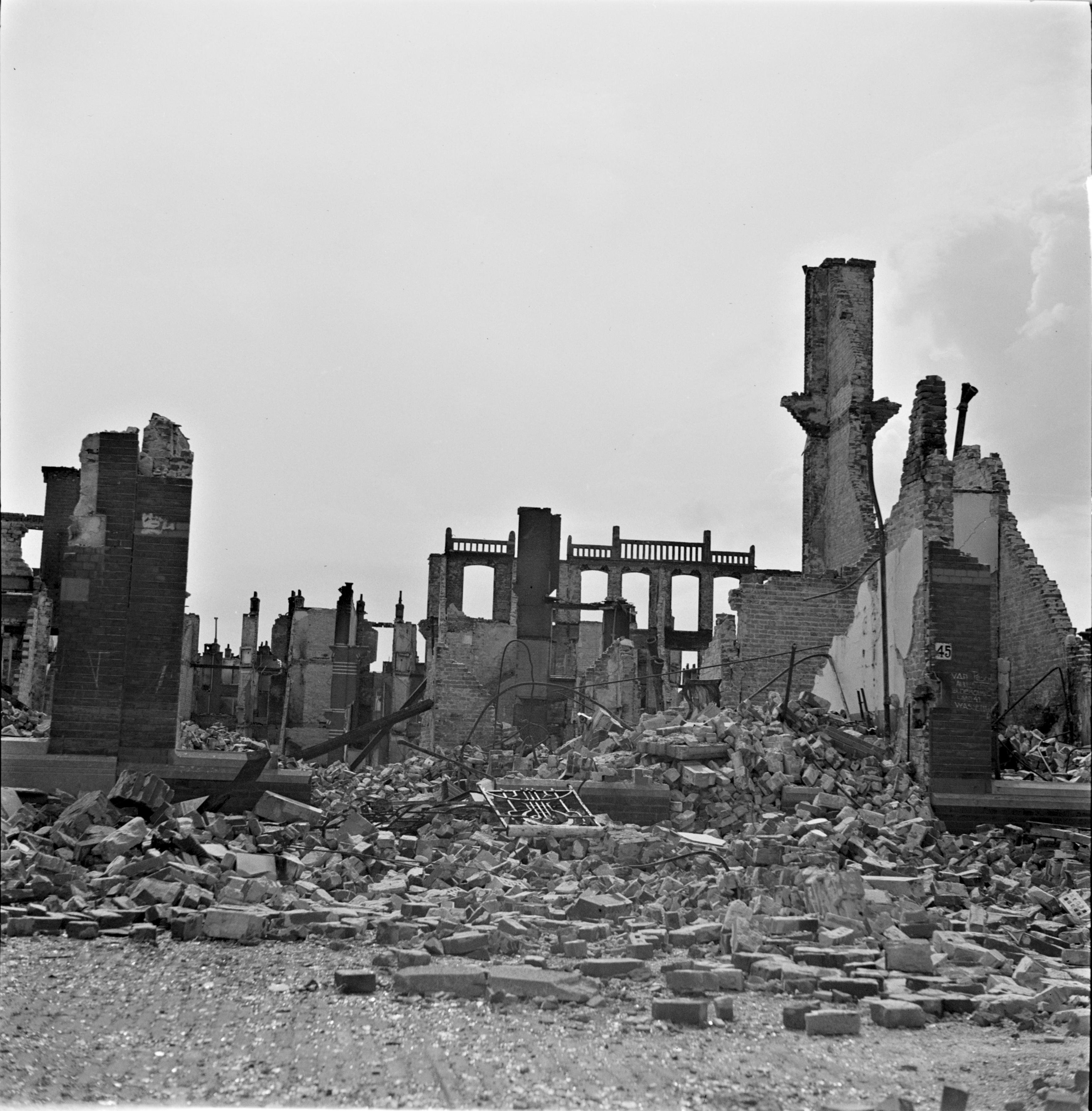
Ruins from the Allied accidental bombing of the Bezuidenhout in 1945, which killed over 500 Dutch civilians

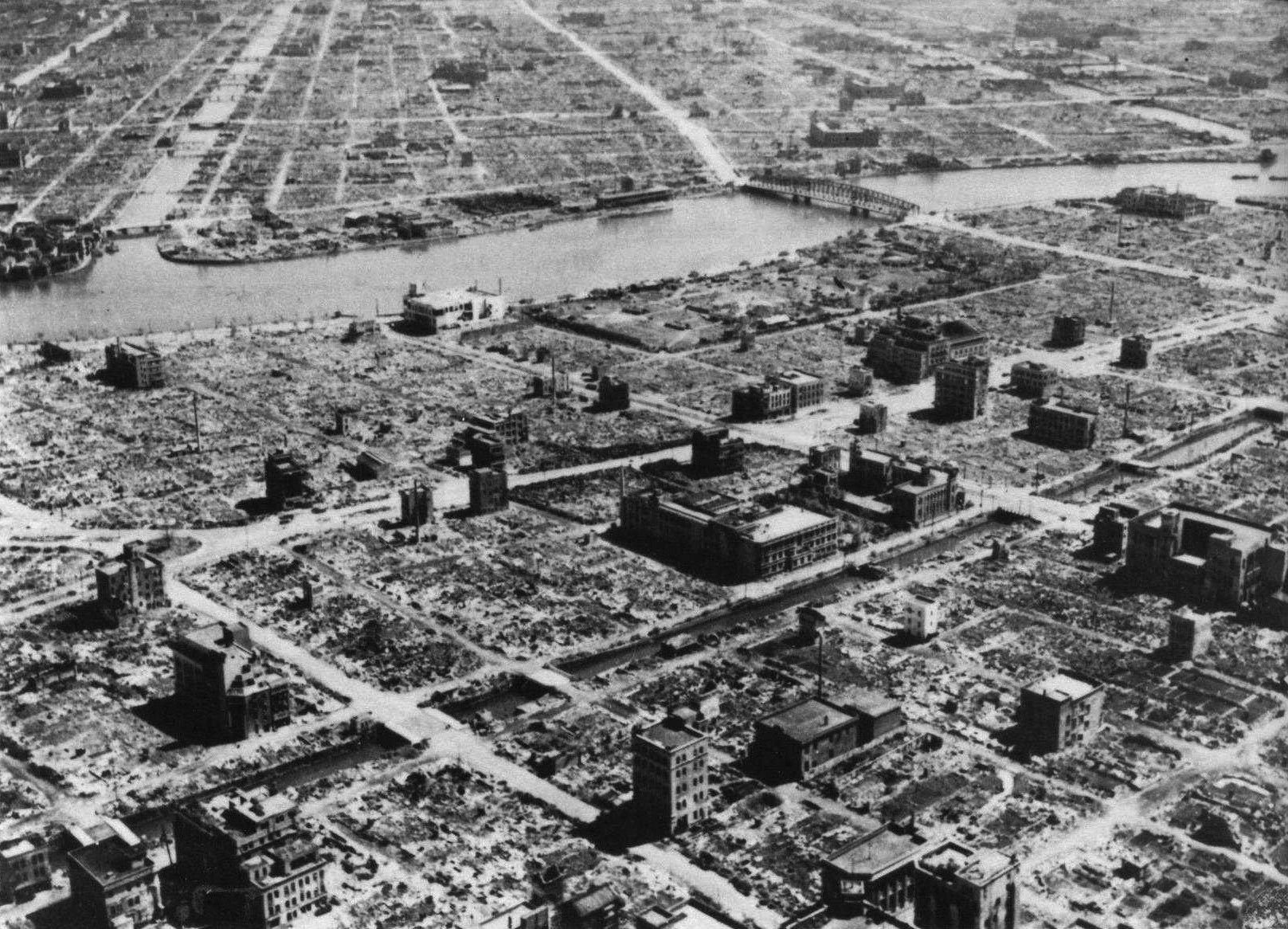
Tokyo after the massive firebombing attack on the night of 9–10 March 1945, the single most destructive raid in military aviation history. The Tokyo firebombing killed around 100,000 civilians, but the city's industrial productivity—the primary target of the bombing—was cut in half.

"Collateral damage" is a term for any incidental and undesired death, injury or other damage inflicted, especially on civilians, as the result of an activity. Originally coined to describe military operations, it is now also used in non-military contexts to refer to negative unintended consequences of an action.

Critics of use of the term "collateral damage" see it as a euphemism that dehumanizes non-combatants killed or injured during combat, used to reduce the perceived culpability of military leadership in failing to prevent non-combatant casualties.

Collateral damage does not include civilian casualties caused by military operations that are intended to terrorize or kill enemy civilians (e.g., the Blitz or Bombing of Hamburg in World War II openly described as "retaliatory" and intended to "make towns uninhabitable").

== Origins and usage ==
The term "collateral damage" is often attributed to economist Thomas Schelling, who used it in his 1961 article Dispersal, Deterrence, and Damage published in Operations Research. In this article, Schelling discussed military strategies that inadvertently lead to the destruction of civilian areas, not directly targeted but affected by military actions intended to affect other strategic assets. The term came into usage during the Vietnam War and over several decades became entrenched in U.S. armed forces jargon.

A 1980s dictionary defined collateral damage as “damage to nonmilitary structures and facilities resulting from a strike on a nearby military target.” "This definition only vaguely implied a lack of intent, if it did at all." However, after the Persian Gulf War, collateral damage appeared in specialized military dictionaries in addition to standard English dictionaries. These definitions included specific reference to “inadvertent” or “unintended” destruction.

According to Scottish linguist Deborah Cameron, "the classic Orwellian arguments for finding this usage objectionable would be that:

- it is jargon, and to the extent that people cannot decode it, it conceals what is actually going on;
- it is a euphemism; abstract, agentless, and affectless, so that even if people succeeded in associating it with a real act or event, they would be insulated from any feelings of repulsion or moral outrage".

In 1999, "collateral damage" (German: Kollateralschaden) was named the German Un-Word of the Year by a jury of linguistic scholars. With this choice, it was criticized that the term had been used by NATO forces to describe civilian casualties during the Kosovo War, which the jury considered to be an inhuman euphemism.

== International humanitarian law ==
Military necessity, along with distinction and proportionality, are three important principles of international humanitarian law, governing the legal use of force in an armed conflict. Offensives causing collateral damage are not automatically classed as a war crimes. They are war crimes when the objective is excessively or solely collateral damage.

Luis Moreno-Ocampo, Chief Prosecutor at the International Criminal Court, investigated allegations of war crimes during the 2003 invasion of Iraq and published an open letter containing his findings. A section titled "Allegations concerning War Crimes" elucidates this usage of military necessity, distinction, and proportionality:

Under international humanitarian law and the Rome Statute, the death of civilians during an armed conflict, no matter how grave and regrettable, does not in itself constitute a war crime. International humanitarian law and the Rome Statute permit belligerents to carry out proportionate attacks against military objectives, even when it is known that some civilian deaths or injuries will occur. A crime occurs if there is an intentional attack directed against civilians (principle of distinction) (Article 8(2)(b)(i)) or an attack is launched on a military objective in the knowledge that the incidental civilian injuries would be clearly excessive in relation to the anticipated military advantage (principle of proportionality) (Article 8(2)(b)(iv).

Article 8(2)(b)(iv) criminalizes intentionally launching an attack in the knowledge that such attack will cause incidental loss of life or injury to civilians or damage to civilian objects or widespread, long-term, and severe damage to the natural environment which would be clearly excessive in relation to the concrete and direct overall military advantage anticipated.

Article 8(2)(b)(iv) draws on the principles in Article 51(5)(b) of the 1977 Additional Protocol I to the 1949 Geneva Conventions, but restricts the criminal prohibition to cases that are "clearly" excessive. The application of Article 8(2)(b)(iv) requires, among other things, an assessment of:

- the anticipated civilian damage or injury
- the anticipated military advantage
- whether (a) was "clearly excessive" in relation to (b).

== U.S. military approach ==
The USAF Intelligence Targeting Guide defines the term as the "unintentional damage or incidental damage affecting facilities, equipment, or personnel, occurring as a result of military actions directed against targeted enemy forces or facilities", stating that "[s]uch damage can occur to friendly, neutral, and even enemy forces". Another United States Department of Defense document uses "[u]nintentional or incidental injury or damage to persons or objects that would not be lawful military targets in the circumstances ruling at the time", which also states that "[s]uch damage is not unlawful so long as it is not excessive in light of the overall military advantage anticipated from the attack".

In U.S. military terminology, the unintentional destruction of allied or neutral targets is called "friendly fire".

The U.S. military follows a technology-based process for estimating and mitigating collateral damage. The software used is known as "FAST-CD" or "Fast Assessment Strike Tool—Collateral Damage".

== Non-military uses of the phrase ==
While not actually invented by the military, its use in military context has been common. However, the term has since been widely adopted for non-military cases, and in particular, the COVID-19 pandemic. A large number of medical, government sources and media use this term widely in relation to deaths caused indirectly as a result of government policy such as lockdowns, and not directly by the virus itself. Significant debate on the pandemic strategy has ensued, with some advocating restrictions such as lockdowns to save lives, where others claim the 'collateral damage' caused by enforced lockdowns, masks and distancing may in fact cause more deaths over a longer term. An example is the Great Barrington Declaration, signed by over 6,000 medical and other professionals (and mentioned in UK parliament and media) has a FAQ page titled 'Lockdowns and collateral damage', and refers to this phrase several times.

The term has also been borrowed by the computing community to refer to the refusal of service to legitimate users when administrators take blanket preventative measures against some individuals who are abusing systems. For example, Realtime Blackhole Lists used to combat email spam generally block ranges of Internet Protocol (IP) addresses rather than individual IPs associated with spam, which can deny legitimate users within those ranges the ability to send email to some domains.

The related term collateral mortality has been presumed to derive from the term "collateral damage" and has been applied within military and non-military contexts. Fisheries are an example of this, where bycatch such as dolphins are called collateral mortality; they are species that die in the pursuit of the legal death of fishing targets, such as tuna.

== See also ==
- Accidental death
- Principles of war
- Unintended consequences
- Human shield
- Center for Civilians in Conflict
- Principle of double effect
- Proportionality (law)
- July 12, 2007, Baghdad airstrike
- NAZA (film)
