= Bombardment =

Military attack by artillery fire

A bombardment is an attack by artillery fire or by dropping bombs from aircraft on fortifications, combatants, or cities and buildings.

Before World War I, the term was limited to the bombardment of defenseless or undefended objects, houses, public buildings, etc. It was loosely employed to describe artillery attacks upon forts or fortified positions in preparation for assaults by infantry. Since then, it has come to mean any mass attack delivered by artillery or short-range tactical missiles, and later, aerial bombardment delivered by aircraft or long-range missiles.

== History ==
In its old strict sense, the term was only applied to the bombardment of defenseless or undefended objects, houses, public buildings, etc., by an assailant with the aim of weakening the opponent's resistance and particularly to pressure the civilian population and authorities of a besieged place to persuade their military commander to capitulate before its defenses were overcome. The practice of employing artillery to achieve these ends was especially common up until World War I; since then long-range artillery bombardment has been joined by aerial bombardment delivered by aircraft or missiles.

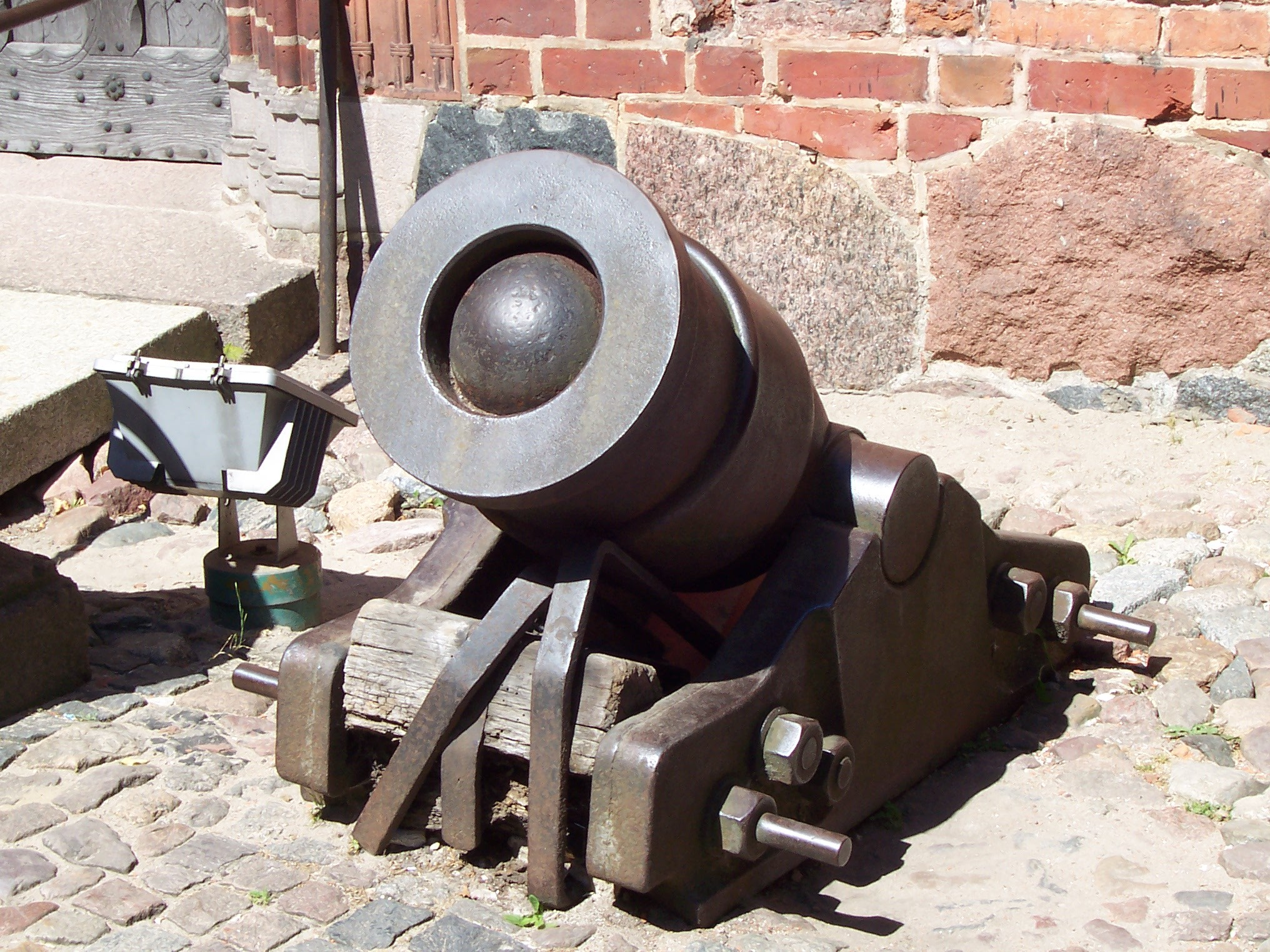
A bombard, Malbork Castle

Bombardment can only achieve its objective when the amount of suffering inflicted upon non-combatants is sufficient to break down their resolution and when the commander permits himself to be influenced or coerced by the sufferers. A threat of bombardment will sometimes induce the target to surrender, but instances of its fulfillment being followed by success are rare; in general, with a determined commander, bombardments fail in their objective. Further, intentionally intense fire at a large target, unlike the slow, steady, and minutely accurate artillery attacks directed upon the fortifications, requires the expenditure of large quantities of ammunition and wears out the guns of the attack. Bombardments are, however, frequently resorted to in order to test the temper of the garrison and the civilian population, a notable instance being the Siege of Strasbourg in 1870.

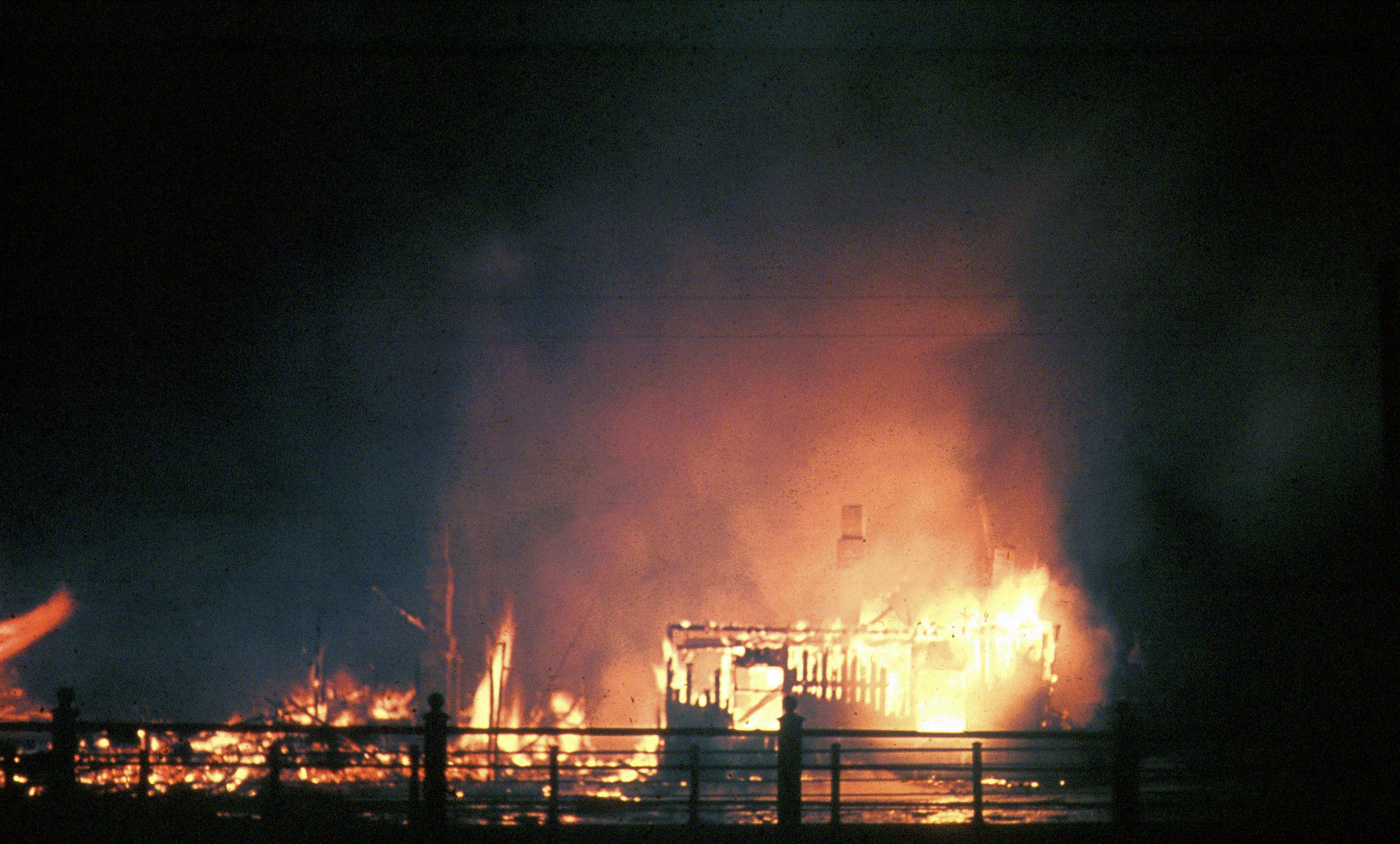
Bombing destruction in Helsinki, Finland, the night of February 6–7, 1944 (during the Continuation War)

The term has evolved during the 20th century to incorporate broader massed artillery attacks by one army against another, for example, the bombardment prior to the 1916 Battle of the Somme or the massed bombardments preceding Operation Uranus during World War II.

== International law ==
In modern international humanitarian law, bombardment is generally treated as a subcategory of "attack", defined in Article 49(1) of Additional Protocol I (1977) to the Geneva Conventions as "acts of violence against the adversary". Article 51(5)(a) of the same protocol lists bombardment as one specific form of attack.

International humanitarian law also requires attacks to comply with the principles of distinction, proportionality, and precautions in attack. These rules require parties to distinguish between military objectives and civilians or civilian objects, refrain from attacks expected to cause excessive incidental civilian harm, and take feasible precautions in planning and conducting attacks.

=== Hague Conventions ===
The first international treaties specifically regulating bombardment emerged from the Hague Peace Conferences of 1899 and 1907. The land warfare regulations adopted in 1899 prohibited attacking or bombarding undefended towns, villages, and dwellings. The 1907 Hague Convention IX (Convention Concerning Bombardment by Naval Forces in Time of War), in force from 26 January 1910, applied comparable restrictions to naval operations.

== Assessment ==
In modern conflicts, the assessment of bombardment increasingly relies on post-strike evaluation, including battle damage assessment, to determine the extent and effects of strikes.
