= Distinction (law) =

Principle in international conflict law

Distinction (the principle of distinction) is a principle under international humanitarian law governing the legal use of force in an armed conflict, whereby belligerents are required to distinguish between combatants and non-combatants (protected civilians): parties to a conflict must “direct their operations only against military objectives.” Combatant in this instance means persons entitled to directly participate in hostilities and thus are not afforded immunity from being directly targeted in situations of armed conflict. Protected civilian in this instance means civilians who are enemy nationals or neutral citizens outside of the territory of a belligerent power. Distinction, proportionality, and precaution are important factors in assessing military necessity in that the harm caused to protected civilians or civilian property must be proportionate and not "excessive in relation to the concrete and direct military advantage anticipated" by an attack on a military objective.

The principle of distinction is a fundamental axiom of the modern law of war—also known as the law of armed conflict or international humanitarian law (IHL)—and requires that only military objects may be lawfully targeted while non-military objects, such as civilian objects, remain immune. Regarding persons, only combatants may be lawfully targeted unless rendered hors de combat by illness, injury, or capture. In order to comply with the principle of distinction, parties to an armed conflict must identify combatants and military objects from non-combatants and non-military objects, such as civilians and civilian objects, and combatants rendered hors de combat due to injury, illness, or capture. This means that direct attacks may only be launched against military objectives, while non-military objects (such as civilian objects) are immune from attack. The principle of distinction is applicable in both international and non-international armed conflicts.

"Sudan, Rwanda, the Former Yugoslavia, Northern Ireland, Israel-Palestine, and the Nagorno-Karabakh region of Azerbaijan are all places where the Principle of Distinction has been systematically violated in recent conflicts."

== Distinction between combatants and protected civilians ==
In interstate or international armed conflicts (IAC), the requirement of distinction between combatants and protected civilians lies at the root of the jus in bello. The principle of distinction is reflected in the treaty law of armed conflict, such as in Article 48 of the 1977 Additional Protocol I to the Geneva Conventions of 1949 for the Protection of War Victims: "the Parties to the conflict shall at all times distinguish between the civilian population and combatants and between civilian objects and military objectives and accordingly direct their operations only against military objectives."

In non-interstate or non-international armed conflicts (NIAC), no requirement of distinction exists under Additional Protocol II to the 1949 Geneva Conventions. However, it did state under Article 13 of Additional Protocol II that civilians "shall enjoy general protection against the dangers arising from military operations" until "they take a direct part in hostilities."

== Codification ==
The principle of distinction is set forth in Article 48 of Additional Protocol I: "the Parties to the conflict shall at all times distinguish between the civilian population and combatants and between civilian objects and military objectives and accordingly shall direct their operations only against military objectives." Other provisions of Additional Protocol I further outline this requirement of distinction, including in Articles 50, 51, and 51(3). Article 50 of Protocol I defines who is a civilian and what is a civilian population; Article 51 describes the protection which should be given to civilian populations; Chapter III regulates the protection of civilian objects. Article 51(3) of Protocol I states that "civilians shall enjoy the protection afforded by this section, unless and for such time as they take a direct part in hostilities."

Article 8(2)(b)(i) of the Rome Statute of the International Criminal Court (ICC) also prohibits attack directed against civilians. Not all states have ratified Protocol I or the Rome Statute, but it is an accepted principle of international humanitarian law (IHL) that the direct targeting of civilians is a breach of the customary laws of war and is binding on all belligerents.

Luis Moreno-Ocampo was the Chief Prosecutor of the International Criminal Court who investigated allegations of war crimes during the 2003 invasion of Iraq. He published an open letter containing his findings, in a section titled "Allegations concerning War Crimes," he elucidates this use of distinction:

Under international humanitarian law and the Rome Statute, the death of civilians during an armed conflict, no matter how grave and regrettable, does not in itself constitute a war crime. International humanitarian law and the Rome Statute permit belligerents to carry out proportionate attacks against military objectives, even when it is known that some civilian deaths or injuries will occur. A crime occurs if there is an intentional attack directed against civilians (principle of distinction) (Article 8(2)(b)(i)) or an attack is launched on a military objective in the knowledge that the incidental civilian injuries would be clearly excessive in relation to the anticipated military advantage (principle of proportionality) (Article 8(2)(b)(iv)).

Article 8(2)(b)(iv) criminalizes:
Intentionally launching an attack in the knowledge that such attack will cause incidental loss of life or injury to civilians or damage to civilian objects or widespread, long-term and severe damage to the natural environment which would be clearly excessive in relation to the concrete and direct overall military advantage anticipated;
Article 8(2)(b)(iv) draws on the principles in Article 51(5)(b) of the 1977 Additional Protocol I to the 1949 Geneva Conventions, but restricts the criminal prohibition to cases that are "clearly" excessive. The application of Article 8(2)(b)(iv) requires, among other things, an assessment of:
(a) the anticipated civilian damage or injury;
(b) the anticipated military advantage;

(c) and whether (a) was "clearly excessive" in relation to (b).

— Luis Moreno-Ocampo

== Additional Protocol I of 1977 ==
=== Chapter II: Civilians and Civilian Populations ===
==== Article 48: Basic Rule ====
In order to ensure respect for and protection of the civilian population and civilian objects, the Parties to the conflict shall at all times distinguish between the civilian population and combatants and between civilian objects and military objectives and accordingly shall direct their operations only against military objectives.

==== Article 51: Protection of the Civilian Population ====
1. The civilian population and individual civilians shall enjoy general protection against dangers arising from military operations. To give effect to this protection, the following rules, which are additional to other applicable rules of international law, shall be observed in all circumstances.
2. The civilian population as such, as well as individual civilians, shall not be the object of attack. Acts or threats of violence the primary purpose of which is to spread terror among the civilian population are prohibited.
3. Civilians shall enjoy the protection afforded by this Section, unless and for such time as they take a direct part in hostilities.
4. Indiscriminate attacks are prohibited. Indiscriminate attacks are:
  - (a) Those which are not directed at a specific military objective;
  - (b) Those which employ a method or means of combat which cannot be directed at a specific military objective; or
  - (c) Those which employ a method or means of combat [that] strike military objectives and civilians or civilian objects without distinction.
5. Among others, the following types of attacks are to be considered as indiscriminate:
  - (a) An attack by bombardment by any methods or means which treats as a single military objective a number of clearly separated and distinct military objectives …; and
  - (b) An attack which may be expected to cause incidental loss of civilian life, injury to civilians, damage to civilian objects, or a combination thereof, which would be excessive in relation to the concrete and direct military advantage anticipated.
6. Attacks against the civilian population or civilians by way of reprisals are prohibited.
7. The presence or movements or the civilian population or individual civilians shall not be used to render certain points or areas immune from military operations, in particular in attempts to shield military objectives from attacks or to shield, favour or impede military operations. The Parties to the conflict shall not direct the movement of the civilian population or individual civilians in order to attempt to shield military objectives from attacks or to shield military operations.
8. Any violation of these prohibitions shall not release the Parties to the conflict from their legal obligations with respect to the civilian population and civilians, including the obligation to take the precautionary measures provided for in Article 57.

=== Chapter III: Civilian Objects ===
==== Article 52: General Protection of Civilian Objects ====
1. …
2. Attacks shall be limited strictly to military objectives. In so far as objects are concerned, military objectives are limited to those objects which by their nature, location, purpose or use make an effective contribution to military action and whose total or partial destruction, capture or neutralization, in the circumstances ruling at the time, offers a definite military advantage.
3. In case of doubt whether an object which is normally dedicated to civilian purposes, such as a place of worship, a house or other dwelling or a school, is being used to make an effective contribution to military action, it shall be presumed not to be so used.

== See also ==
- Civilian
- Non-combatant
- Combatant
- Proportionality (law)
- Military necessity
- Human shield (law)
- Indiscriminate attack
- Law of war (also known as international humanitarian law or law of armed conflict)
- ICJ Opinion on the Legality of the Threat or Use of Nuclear Weapons
- Civilian casualty ratio
- Noncombatant casualty value
