= Free Polish =

The term Free Polish can refer to the following:

- Polish government-in-exile - The remnants of the Polish government, based in the United Kingdom, following the Invasion of Poland during World War II
- Polish Armed Forces in the West - The military forces of the Polish government-in-exile serving with the Western Allies in many of the major battles of World War II.
- Polish Armed Forces in the East - Polish military forces established in the Soviet Union during World War II.

However, the expression "Free Polish" (inspired by the term Free French) is technically misleading and unnecessary since, unlike France, Poland never surrendered to the Third Reich. Poland's armed forces, under an exilé but fully legitimate government, continued their fight from bases in the United Kingdom and there was no official collaborator regime in their homeland to differentiate from in political terms.
