= Surrender (military) =

Giving up control over territory or resources to another power

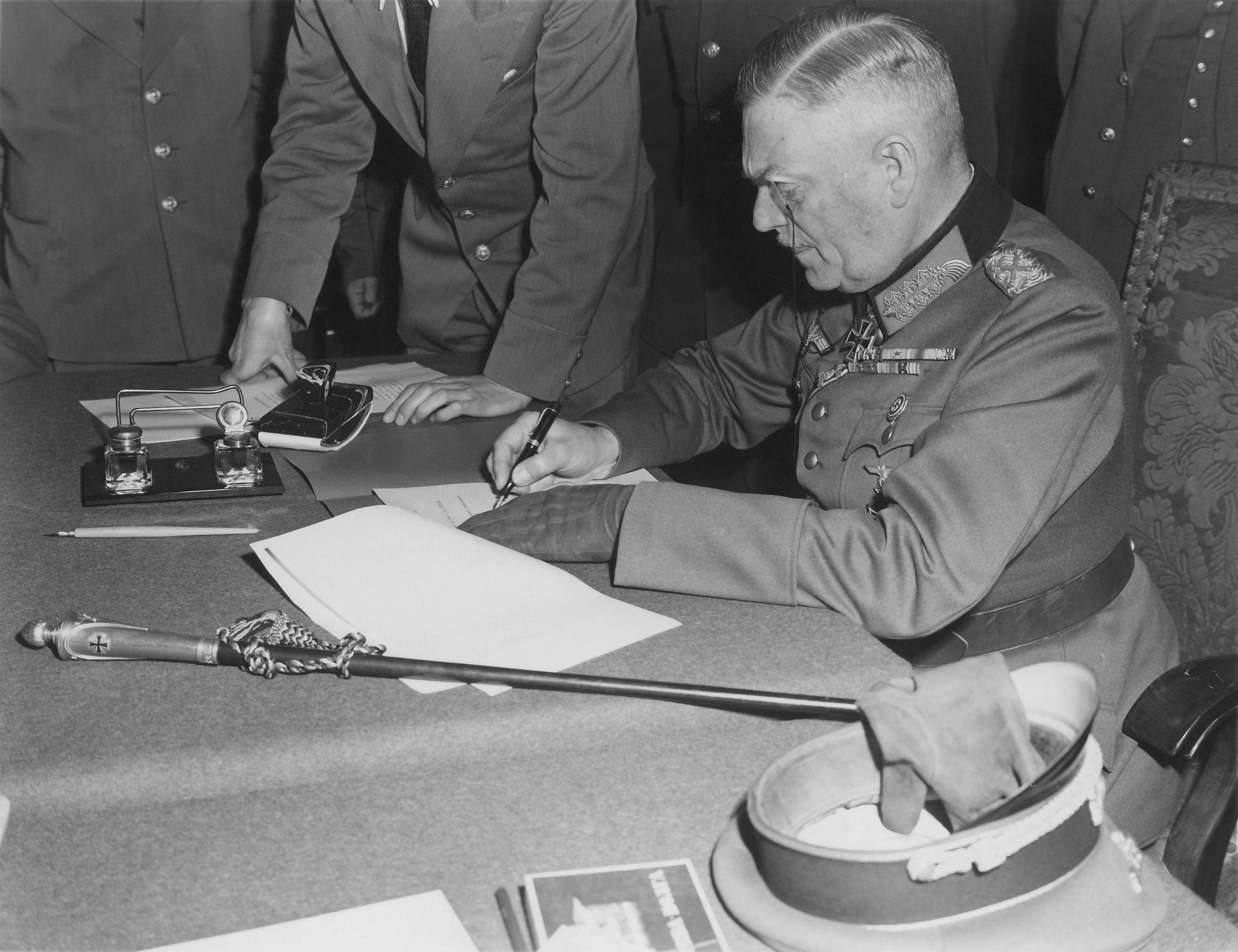
Field Marshal Wilhelm Keitel signing the German Instrument of Surrender at the Soviet headquarters in Karlshorst, Berlin, on 8 May 1945.

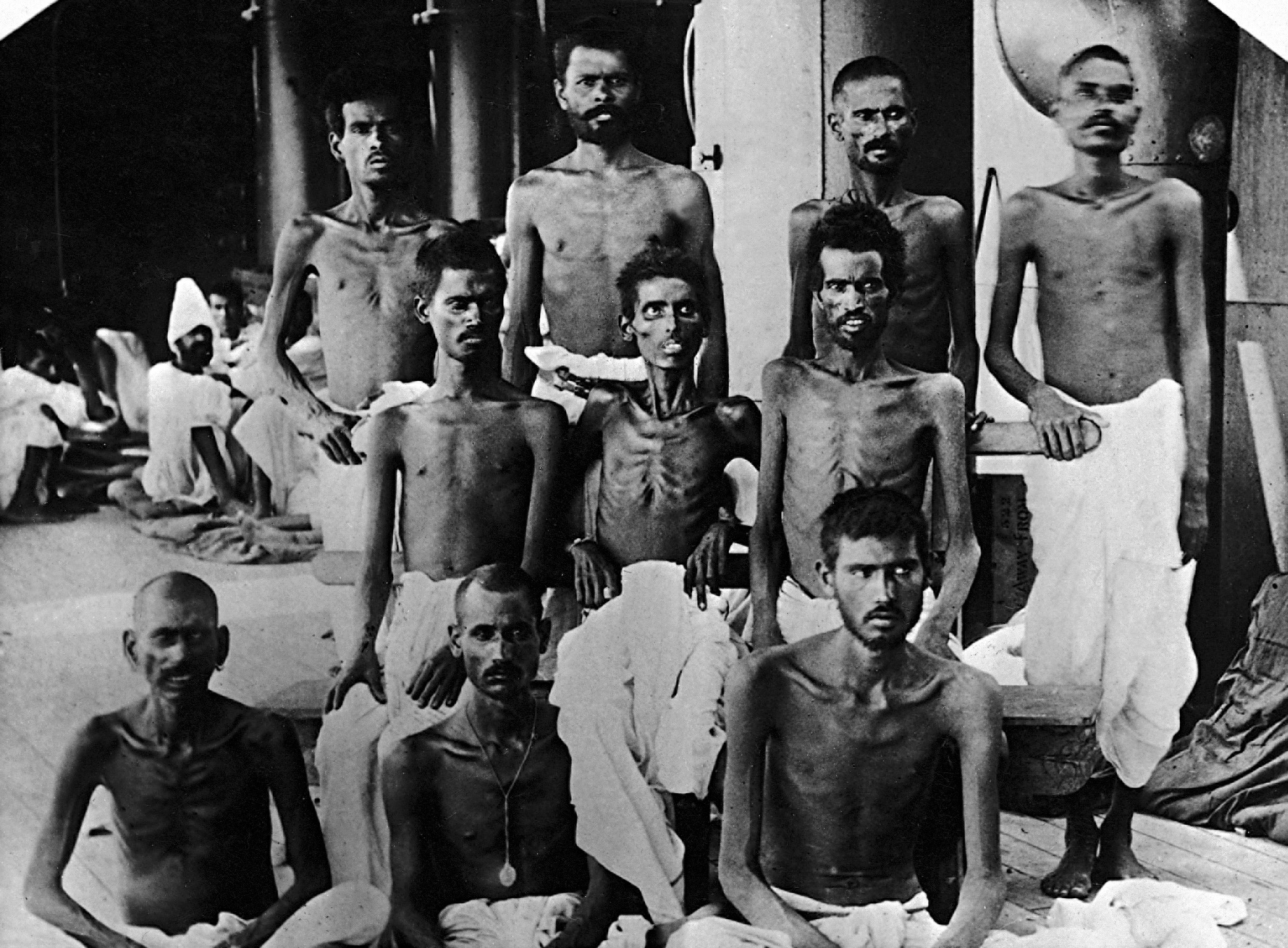
10,000 Indian troops completely cornered by the Ottomans and forced into an unconditional surrender at Kut-al-Amara (1916).

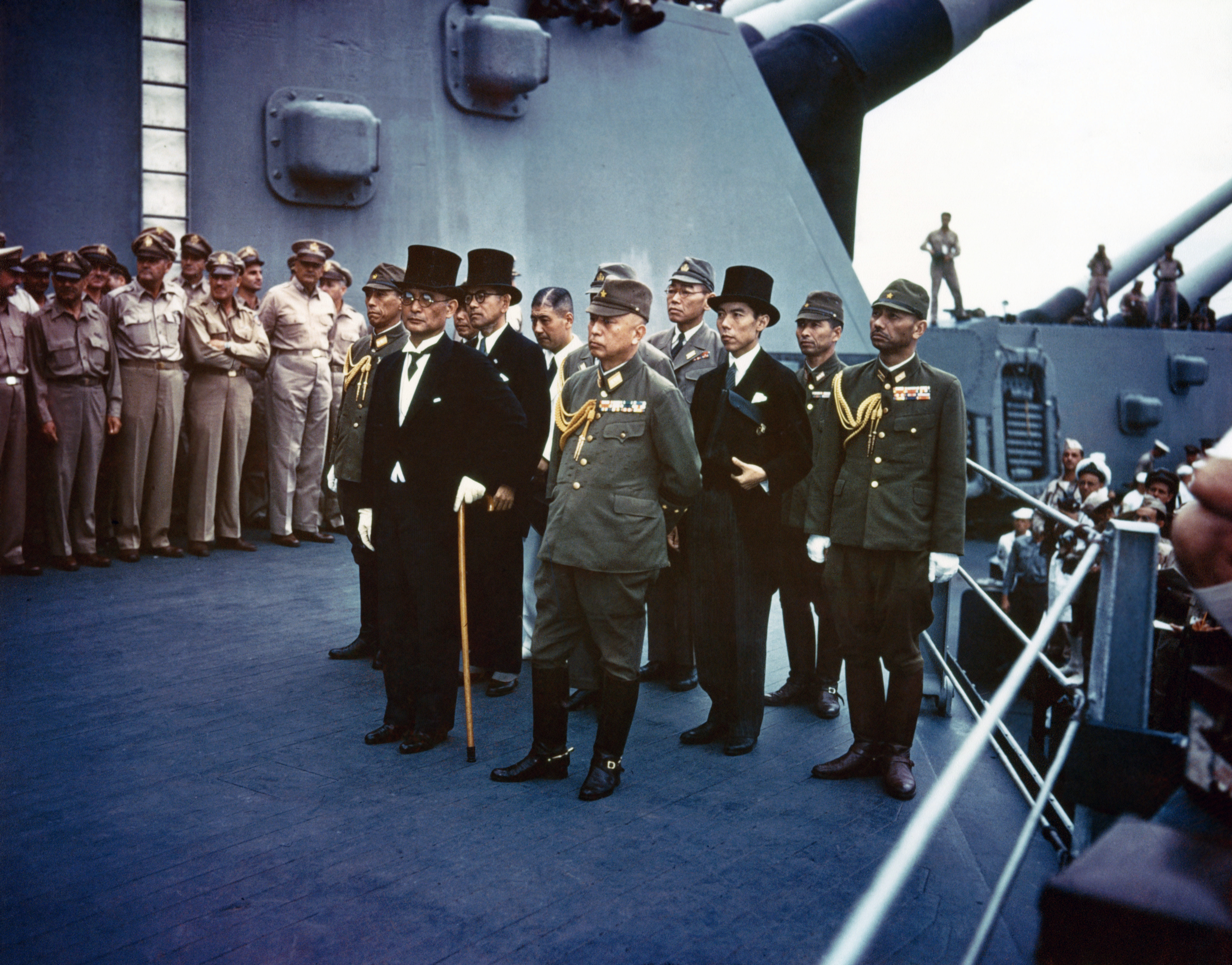
Representatives on board the USS Missouri to effect the surrender of Japan at the end of World War II

Surrender, in military terms, is the relinquishment of control over territory, combatants, fortifications, ships, or armament to another power. A surrender may be accomplished peacefully or it may be the result of defeat in battle. A sovereign state may surrender following defeat in a war, usually by signing a peace treaty or capitulation agreement. A battlefield surrender, either by individuals or when ordered by officers, normally results in those surrendering becoming prisoners of war.

== Definition and etymology ==
Merriam-Webster defines "surrender" as "the action of yielding one's person or giving up the possession of something especially into the power of another", and traces the etymology to the Middle English surrendre, from French sur- or sus-, suz "under" + rendre "to give back"; this in turn is defined by the University of Michigan Middle English Dictionary as meaning "The giving up of an estate, a grant of land, or an interest in property to the person who holds the right to it", or, in law, "the relinquishing of letters patent to the king", or "the giving back or return of something".

== Signs and gestures of surrender ==
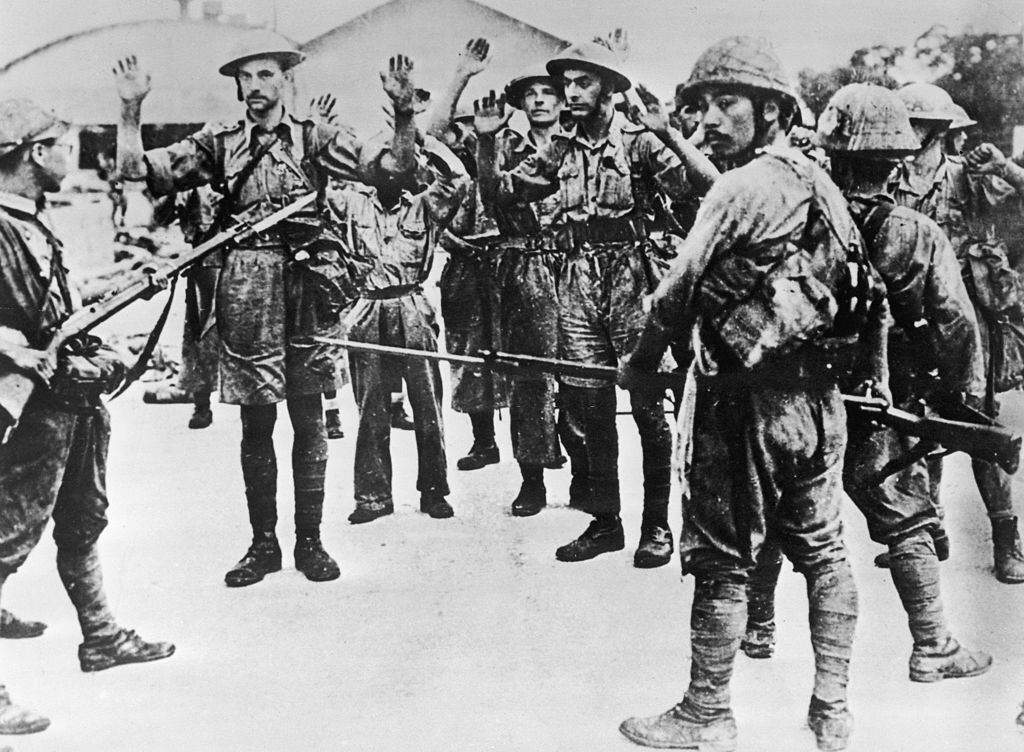
Troops of the Suffolk Regiment surrendering to the Japanese after the Battle of Singapore, 1942

A white flag or handkerchief is often taken or intended as a signal of a desire to surrender, but in international law, it simply represents a desire for a parley that may or may not result in a formal surrender. Normally, a surrender will involve the handing over of weapons; previously the commanding officer of a surrendering force symbolically offered his sword to the victorious commander. Individual combatants can indicate a surrender by discarding weapons and raising their hands empty and open above their heads; a surrendering tank commander should point the tank's turret away from opposing combatants, although they may have to leave the tank in order to clearly signal surrender. Flags and ensigns are hauled down or furled, and ships' colors are struck.

According to a leaflet given to British Empire troops before the Gallipoli landings, "Turkish soldiers as a rule manifest their desire to surrender by holding their rifle butt upwards and by waving clothes or rags of any colour." The leaflet also claimed that, "An actual white flag should be regarded with the utmost suspicion as a Turkish soldier is unlikely to possess anything of that colour," suggesting that a white flag would be used in an act of perfidy.

== Process ==
When the parties agree to terms, the surrender may be conditional; that is, the surrendering party agrees to submit only after the victor makes certain promises. The leaders of the surrendering group negotiate privileges or compensation for the time, expense and loss of life saved by the victor through the stopping of resistance.

Alternatively, in a surrender at discretion (unconditional surrender), the victor makes no promises of treatment, and unilaterally defines the treatment of the vanquished party. An early example of a military surrender is the defeat of Carthage by the Roman Empire at the end of the Second Punic War. Over time, generally accepted laws and customs of war have been developed for such a situation, most of which are laid out in the Hague Convention of 1907 and the Geneva Conventions. Normally, a belligerent will agree to surrender unconditionally only if completely incapable of continuing hostilities. Traditionally, a surrender ceremony was accompanied by the honors of war.

The Third Geneva Convention states that prisoners of war should not be mistreated or abused. US Army policy, for example, requires that surrendered persons should be secured and safeguarded while being evacuated from the battlefield.

While not a formal military law, the Code of the US Fighting Force disallows surrender unless "all reasonable means of resistance [are] exhausted and ... certain death the only alternative": the Code states, "I will never surrender of my own free will. If in command, I will never surrender the members of my command while they still have the means to resist".

== False surrender ==
False surrender is a type of perfidy in the context of war. It is a war crime under Protocol I of the Geneva Convention. False surrenders are usually used to draw the enemy out of cover to attack them off guard, but they may be used in larger operations such as during a siege. Accounts of false surrender can be found relatively frequently throughout history.

== See also ==
- Capitulation, an agreement in time of war for the surrender to a hostile armed force of a particular body of troops, a town or a territory.
- Debellatio occurs when a war ends because of the complete destruction of a belligerent state.
- No quarter occurs when a victor shows no clemency or mercy and refuses to spare the life of the vanquished when they surrender at discretion. Under the laws of war, "it is especially forbidden ... to declare that no quarter will be given".
- Unconditional surrender is a surrender without conditions, except for those provided by international law.
