= Non-combatant =

Person who does not take a direct part in hostilities during war

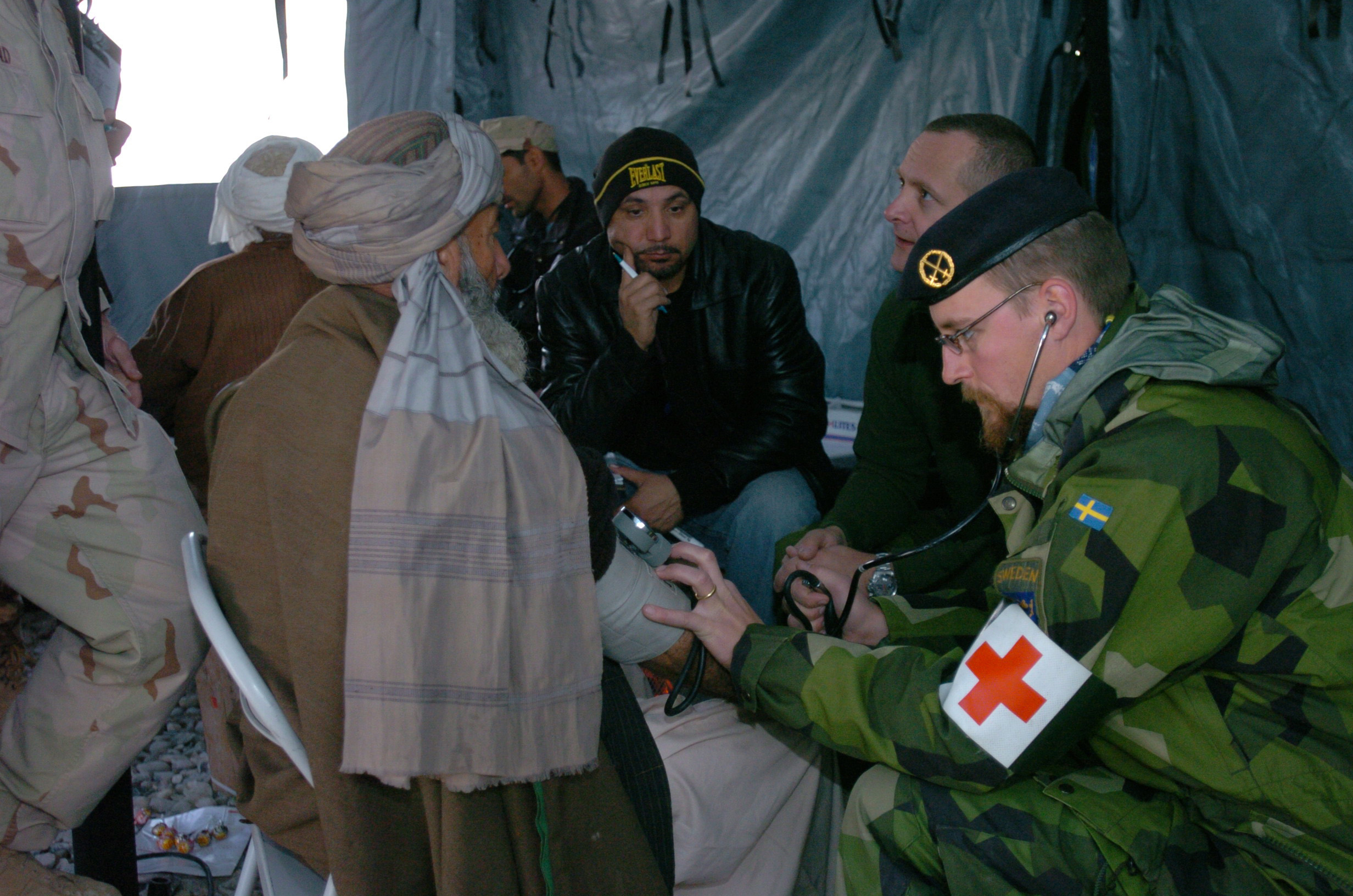
A Swedish Army medic wearing a Red Cross treats an Afghan civilian in 2006, during the War in Afghanistan. They would be considered non-combatants in the war.

In the law of war, a non-combatant is a person who is not or is no longer actively participating in hostilities during a war. This includes civilians, prisoners of war, and wounded, sick or injured former combatants (hors de combat). The term also includes persons such as combat medics and military chaplains (who are members of the belligerent armed forces, but are protected because of their specific duties) and neutral persons (such as peacekeepers, who are not involved in fighting for one of the belligerents involved in a war). This particular status was first recognized under the First Geneva Convention of 1864.

At the heart of the law of war is a series of prohibitions of violence against and mistreatment of non-combatants. Under international humanitarian law (IHL), certain non-combatants are classified as protected persons, who are to be protected under laws applicable to international armed conflict at all times.

One of the key principles of the law of war (i.e. IHL) is that: “Non-combatants are to be spared from various forms of harm; this category includes not only civilians but also former combatants, such as prisoners-of-war and fighters rendered hors de combat because they are wounded, sick, shipwrecked or have surrendered.“ Another key IHL principle is that the distinction between combatants and non-combatants must be respected.

== Law of war and protection of non-combatants ==
Under the law of war, all persons who are not or no longer taking part in hostilities are protected.

=== International treaty law ===
==== Hague Conventions ====
The Hague Conventions of 1899 and 1907 were one of the first multi-country treaties to agree on rights for non-combatants. These meetings occurred in 1899 and 1907. Three treaties were signed and put into effect in 1899, including the treatment of prisoners of war and the protection of hospital ships. In 1907 thirteen additional treaties were signed. These cover regulations concerning the war on land, the declaration of war, the rights and responsibilities of neutral countries, and rights and restrictions during naval war.

Treaty II, Article 3 of the 1899 Convention maintains that surrendering belligerent fighters are to be treated as prisoners of war unless they are out of proper uniforms (i.e. spies). Article 13 of the same section declares that any other non-combatant or civilian affiliated with but not part of the belligerent military, such as reporters and contractors, have the same right to be treated as a prisoner of war.

Article 25 of Treaty II states that undefended communities are protected from any form of attack. In addition to the above, Article 27 states that if any sieges do occur, places devoted to religion, charity or hospitals should be avoided if possible, as long as they have no strategic affiliations. Article 28 states that even when a village is captured through war, pillaging is not allowed by any party. That is repeated in Article 47, Section III. The articles above were reaffirmed by Convention IV of the 1907 Convention.

Many nations signed, including delegates from the United Kingdom, the United States, Russia, and Japan. Despite many nations signing at the Hague Conventions of 1899 and 1907, a number of the agreements were broken during World War I, including sections from Treaty IV involving poisons and the attacking of undefended towns and villages.

While some Geneva Conventions occurred before the Hague Conventions, none touched on the rights of protected non-combatants in the heat of combat. The Geneva Conventions recognize and expand on many of the treaties signed at the Hague Conventions, particularly those involving the treatment of non-combatants. As a result, the regulations are still in effect today.

==== Geneva Conventions of 1949 ====
The Geneva Conventions started on April 21, 1949, and were concluded on August 12. The purpose of the Conventions was to establish protections afforded to protected non-combatants in wartime, including civilians under military occupations and prisoners of war. Article 4 of the Fourth Geneva Convention defines that civilians who "find themselves, in case of a conflict or occupation, in the hands of a Party to the conflict or Occupying Power of which they are not nationals" are protected persons. Not included in the status of protected persons are the belligerent's citizens and nationals of a state not party to the Fourth Geneva Convention, and neutral citizens living in a belligerent country and co-belligerent (i.e., allied) persons as long their state of nationality maintains diplomatic relations with a belligerent power.

The four 1949 Geneva Conventions make a distinction between several categories of persons: (I) wounded and sick in armed forces in the field; (II) wounded, sick and shipwrecked members of armed forces at sea; (III) prisoners of war; and (IV) civilian persons in time of war.

==== Additional Protocols of 1977 ====
Article 42 of Protocol I states that aircrews who are parachuting from aircraft in distress cannot be attacked regardless of what territory they are over. If aircrews land in territory controlled by the enemy, they must be allowed to surrender before being attacked unless it is apparent that they are engaging in a hostile act or attempting to escape. Airborne forces who are descending by parachute from an aircraft, whether it is disabled or not, are not given the protection afforded by this Article and, therefore, may be attacked during their descent unless they are hors de combat.

Article 50 of Protocol 1 defines a civilian as a person who is not a privileged combatant. Article 51 describes the protection that must be given to civilians (unless they are unprivileged combatants) and civilian populations. Article 54 deals with the protection of objects indispensable to the survival of the civilian population and is categorical that "Starvation of civilians as a method of warfare is prohibited." Chapter III of Protocol I regulates the targeting of civilian objects. Article 8(2)(b)(i) of the Rome Statute of the International Criminal Court also prohibits attacks directed against civilians.

While not all states have ratified Protocol I or the Rome Statute, these provisions reiterated existing customary laws of war which are binding for all belligerents in an international conflict.

Article 3 in the general section of the Geneva Conventions states that in the case of armed conflict not of an international character (occurring in the territory of one of the High Contracting Parties) that each Party to the conflict shall be bound to apply, as a minimum, the following provisions to "persons taking no active part in the hostilities" (non-combatants). Such persons shall in all circumstances be treated humanely, with the following prohibitions:

(a) violence to life and person, in particular murder of all kinds, mutilation, cruel treatment, and torture;
(b) taking of hostages;
(c) outrages upon personal dignity, in particular, humiliating and degrading treatment;
(d) the passing of sentences and the carrying out of executions without previous judgement pronounced by a regularly constituted court, affording all the judicial guarantees which are recognized as indispensable by civilized peoples.

=== Customary international law ===
The prohibition against targeting non-combatants is a basic principle that is part of customary international law.

== Non-combatant immunity ==
Non-combatant immunity is the principle that non-combatants who are not directly engaged in the fighting of a war should not be attacked.

== Principle of non-combatant immunity ==
There is a long-standing and widespread normative belief or international norm that non-combatants (individuals posing no immediate threat to their attackers) should and could be provided with immunity from the violence of a war.

Historian Sahr Conway-Lanz has stated:

Noncombatant immunity has served as a fundamental limit on political violence, and many cultures have come to equate deviations from the norm with what it means to commit an atrocity. In the twentieth century, noncombatant immunity has emerged as a basic human right codified in international law.

== Non-combatants and modern warfare ==
=== World War II ===
In World War II, non-combatants were more affected than they were in previous wars. Sources claim that over forty-five million civilians and non-combatants lost their lives throughout the war. This number, however, is largely debated. Despite the understanding that over 18 million were killed in the Holocaust and as a result of other Nazi persecution, the exact number will likely never be determined. There is also difficulty of estimating the numbers for events such as the Nanjing massacre, though it is estimated that between 200,000 and 300,000 civilians and prisoners of war were slaughtered. This does not necessarily include military, non-combatant or civilian people killed by radiation, disease, or other means as a result of war. After World War II ended, countries got together with the aim to give rights to non-combatants and created the 1949 Geneva Conventions, built off the 1907 Hague Convention.

=== Vietnam War ===
The Vietnam War was one war in the mid-20th century in which many civilians were killed. Many civilians were not specifically identified as whether they were non-combatants or ordinary civilians, which might have been directly or indirectly killing hundreds and thousands of Vietnamese civilians. However, there is no exact proportion of the number of non-combatants who have or were specified the exact figure, the statistics that have been given were all the estimates on how many civilians and combatants were killed. Most of the recorded numbers of people missing or killed were not specific, but all were casualties, meaning there is/was no exact figure for combatants or non-combatants. Military records in the National Archives do not specify how many non-combatants were killed during the Vietnam War.

Thousands of people were killed: civilians, casualties, combatants and non-combatants and so as ordinary civilians (citizens) in Vietnam but also in Laos and Cambodia. Thus, all figures do not specify how many non-combatants were killed or injured.

=== War on terrorism ===
Although there is no clear definition of terrorism, a terrorist can be explained as an individual who is a non-state actor who engages in armed hostilities toward a state or government during a time of peace. The location an individual is tried in a court of law is the determining factor between combatant and non-combatant terrorists. Individuals like the San Bernardino shooters, the Tsarnaev brothers and the people responsible for the September 11 attacks would be characterized as non-combatant terrorists. Groups like Al-Qaeda are considered combatant terrorists or may also be called unlawful combatants. Non-combatants can also be looked at as radical civilians and combatants can be seen as military soldiers.

As of 2017, there are inconsistent ways in which the prosecutions of terrorists are conducted. Possible solutions would be to take all individuals classified as non-combatants and have them charged as criminals and prosecute the individuals who are considered combatants and engage in warfare attacks under military commissions. Combatant terrorists are captured and detained to put an end to their hostilities and are labeled as prisoners of war, and non-combatants are considered criminals.

== See also ==
- Law of war
- Geneva Conventions of 1949
- Rule of Law in Armed Conflicts Project
