= Combatant =

Person who takes a direct part in the hostilities of an armed conflict

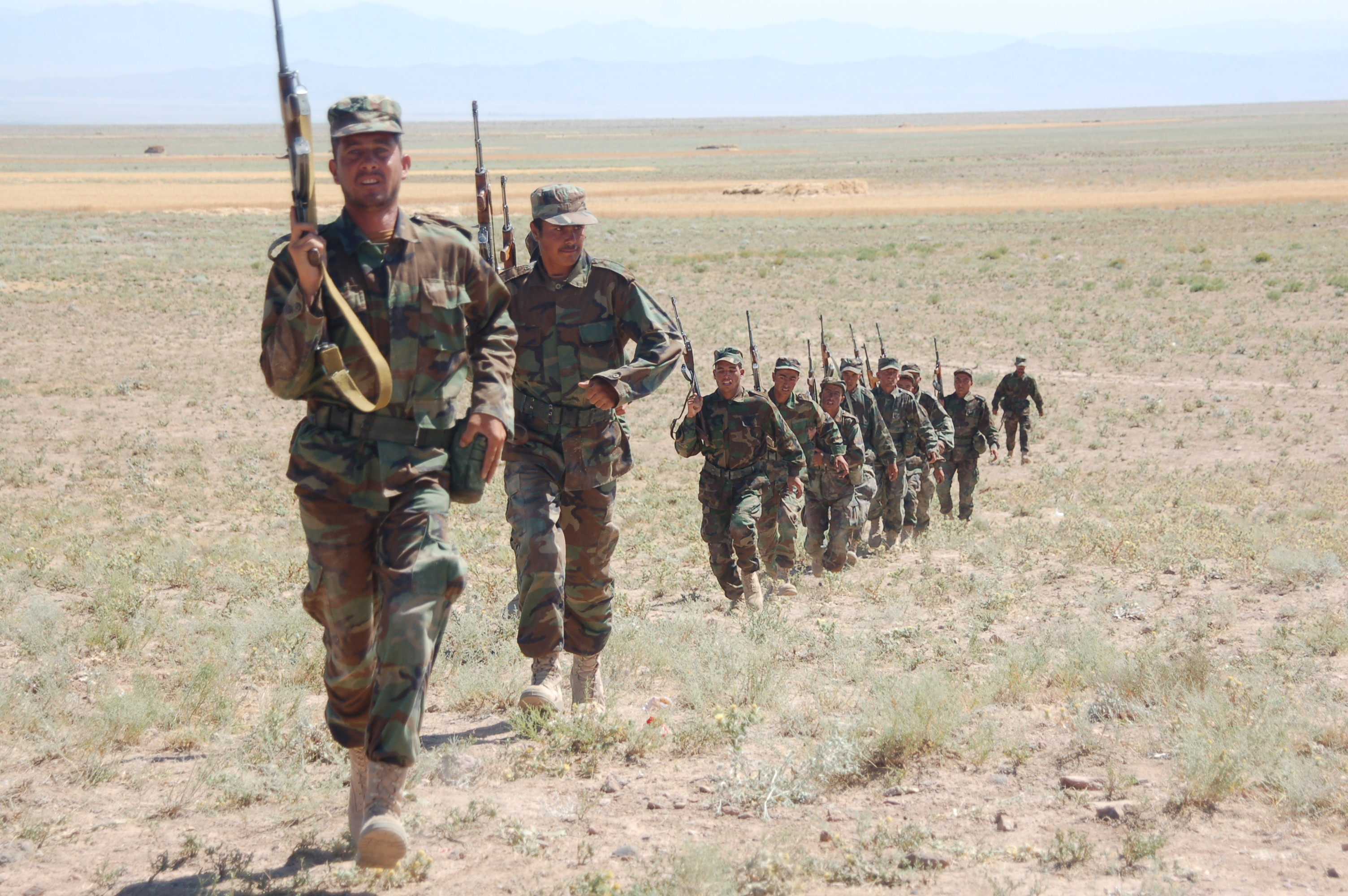
Afghan soldiers on patrol in 2011, during the War in Afghanistan. As adult armed personnel in active service with a military force, they would legally be considered combatants and therefore could launch targeted attacks against, or be subject to targeted attacks by, opposing armed forces.

Combatant is the legal status of a person entitled to directly participate in hostilities during an armed conflict, and may be intentionally targeted by a belligerent for their participation in the armed conflict under the law of war. Combatants are not afforded immunity from being directly targeted in situations of armed conflict and can be attacked regardless of the specific circumstances simply due to their status, so as to deprive their side of their support.

In interstate or international armed conflicts, the definition of "combatant" is found in Article 43(2) of "Protocol Additional to the Geneva Conventions of 12 August 1949, and relating to the Protection of Victims of International Armed Conflicts" (Additional Protocol I): "Members of the armed forces of a Party to a conflict (other than medical personnel and chaplains covered by Article 33 of the Third Geneva Convention) are combatants, that is to say, they have the right to participate directly in hostilities." When captured by an opposing party, combatants are automatically granted the status of protected persons.

In non-interstate or non-international armed conflicts, combatants who have fought with non-state armed groups are not afforded immunity for taking part in hostilities, as insurrection is a crime under the domestic law of most nations. Therefore, they can be prosecuted by the territorial state or intervening third state for simply taking up arms.

"It is a war crime to kill or wound a combatant who has surrendered or is otherwise hors de combat ('out of the fight')." This prohibition is drawn from the 1907 Hague Regulations and Additional Protocol I.

== Distinction between combatants and protected civilians ==
The preamble to the 1868 St. Petersburg Declaration states that "the progress of civilization should have the effect of alleviating as much as possible the calamities of war; that the only legitimate object which States should endeavour to accomplish during war is to weaken the military forces of the enemy."

== Legal status of combatants ==
=== International armed conflicts (IAC) ===
In interstate or international armed conflicts, the requirement of distinction between combatants and protected civilians lies at the root of the jus in bello. It is reflected in Article 48 of Additional Protocol I of 1977 to the 1949 Geneva Conventions for the Protection of War Victims, entitled "Basic rule": "the Parties to the conflict shall at all times distinguish between the civilian population and combatants and between civilian objects and military objectives and accordingly direct their operations only against military objectives."

Under international humanitarian law applicable to international armed conflicts, combatants may be classified in one of two categories: privileged or unprivileged. In that sense, privileged means the retainment of prisoner-of-war status and impunity for the conduct prior to capture. Thus, combatants that have violated certain terms of the IHL may lose their status and become unprivileged combatants either ipso jure (merely by having committed the act) or by decision of a competent court or tribunal. In the relevant treaties, the distinction between privileged and unprivileged is not made textually; international law uses the term combatant exclusively in the sense of what is here termed "privileged combatant".

Article 5 of the Third Geneva Convention states, "If there is any doubt as to whether a person benefits from "combatant" status, they must be held as a prisoner of war until they have faced a "competent tribunal" to decide the issue."

==== Privileged combatants ====
The following categories of combatants qualify for prisoner-of-war status on capture:

1. Members of the armed forces of a Party to the conflict as well as members of militias or volunteer corps forming part of such armed forces.
2. Members of other militias and members of other volunteer corps, including those of organized resistance movements, belonging to a party to the conflict and operating in or outside their own territory, even if this territory is occupied, provided that they fulfill the following conditions:
  - that of being commanded by a person responsible for his subordinates;
  - that of having a fixed distinctive sign recognizable at a distance;
  - that of carrying arms openly;
  - that of conducting their operations in accordance with the laws and customs of war.
3. Members of regular armed forces who profess allegiance to a government or an authority not recognized by the Detaining Power.
4. Inhabitants of a non-occupied territory, who on the approach of the enemy spontaneously take up arms to resist the invading forces, without having had time to form themselves into regular armed units, provided they carry arms openly and respect the laws and customs of war; often dubbed a levée after the mass conscription during the French Revolution.

For countries which have signed Protocol I, combatants who do not wear a distinguishing mark still qualify as prisoners of war if they carry arms openly during military engagements, and while visible to the enemy when they are deploying to conduct an attack against them.

==== Unprivileged combatants ====
There are several types of combatants who do not qualify as privileged combatants:

- Combatants who would otherwise be privileged but have breached the laws and customs of war (i.e., committing perfidy or killing surrendered enemy combatants). The loss of privileges in that case only occurs upon conviction (i.e., after a competent court has determined the unlawfulness of the conduct in a fair trial).
- Combatants who are captured without the minimum requirements for distinguishing themselves from the civilian population (i.e., carrying arms openly during military engagements and the deployment immediately preceding it), lose their right to prisoner of war status without trial under Article 44(3) of Protocol I.
- Spies (i.e., persons who collect information clandestinely in the territory of the opposing belligerent). Members of the armed forces conducting reconnaissance or special forces behind enemy lines are not considered spies as long as they wear their own uniform.
- Mercenaries, child soldiers, and civilians who take a direct part in combat (directly participate in hostilities) and do not fall into one of the categories listed in the previous section.

Most unprivileged combatants who do not qualify for protection under the Third Geneva Convention do so under the Fourth Geneva Convention, which concerns protected civilians, until they have had a "fair and regular trial." If found guilty at a regular trial, they can be punished under the civilian laws of the detaining power.

=== Non-international armed conflicts (NIAC) ===
In non-interstate or non-international armed conflicts, no requirement of distinction exists under Protocol II to the 1949 Geneva Conventions. However, Article 13 of Protocol II does state that civilians "shall enjoy general protection against the dangers arising from military operations" until "they take a direct part in hostilities".

Combatants who fought with non-state armed groups in non-international armed conflicts are not afforded immunity for taking part in hostilities, as insurrection is a crime under the domestic law of most nations. Therefore, they can be prosecuted by the territorial state or intervening third state for simply taking up arms.

On 7 October 2021, a former Taliban commander was indicted by a federal grand jury in New York for the 26 June 2008 attack on an American military convoy that killed three U.S. soldiers and their Afghan interpreter, and 27 October 2008 shooting down of a U.S. military helicopter during the War in Afghanistan (the conflict became non-interstate not long after the U.S. invasion of Afghanistan ended on 7 December 2001).

== See also ==
- Non-combatant
- Distinction (law)
- Law of war (also known as International humanitarian law)
- Rule of Law in Armed Conflicts Project
- Legitimate military target
