= Protocol I to the Geneva Conventions =

1977 amendment protocol to the Geneva Convention

Geneva Conventions Protocol I
Protocol Additional to the Geneva Conventions of 12 August 1949, and relating to the Protection of Victims of International Armed Conflicts (Protocol I)
- Type: Protocol
- Drafted: 20 February 1974 – 8 June 1977
- Signed: 8 June 1977
- Location: Geneva
- Effective: 7 December 1978
- Signatories: 3 states: Iran; Pakistan; United States
- Parties: 175 states: Afghanistan; Albania; Algeria; Andorra; Angola; Antigua and Barbuda; Argentina; Armenia; Australia; Austria; Bahamas; Bahrain; Bangladesh; Barbados; Belarus; Belgium; Belize; Benin; Bolivia; Bosnia and Herzegovina; Botswana; Brazil; Brunei; Bulgaria; Burkina Faso; Burundi; Cambodia; Cameroon; Canada; Cape Verde; Central African Republic; Chad; Chile; China; Colombia; Comoros; Congo; Cook Islands; Costa Rica; Croatia; Cuba; Cyprus; Czech Republic; DR Congo; Denmark; Djibouti; Dominica; Dominican Republic; Ecuador; Egypt; El Salvador; Equatorial Guinea; Estonia; Eswatini; Ethiopia; Fiji; Finland; France; Gabon; Gambia; Georgia; Germany; Ghana; Greece; Grenada; Guatemala; Guinea; Guinea-Bissau; Guyana; Haiti; Holy See; Honduras; Hungary; Iceland; Iraq; Ireland; Italy; Ivory Coast; Jamaica; Japan; Jordan; Kazakhstan; Kenya; Kuwait; Kyrgyzstan; Laos; Latvia; Lebanon; Lesotho; Liberia; Libya; Liechtenstein; Lithuania; Luxembourg; Madagascar; Malawi; Maldives; Mali; Malta; Mauritania; Mauritius; Mexico; Federated States of Micronesia; Moldova; Monaco; Mongolia; Montenegro; Morocco; Mozambique; Namibia; Nauru; Netherlands; New Zealand; Nicaragua; Niger; Nigeria; North Korea; North Macedonia; Norway; Oman; Palau; Palestine; Panama; Paraguay; Peru; Philippines; Poland; Portugal; Qatar; Romania; Russia; Rwanda; Saint Kitts and Nevis; Saint Lucia; Saint Vincent and the Grenadines; Samoa; San Marino; São Tomé and Príncipe; Saudi Arabia; Senegal; Serbia; Seychelles; Sierra Leone; Slovakia; Slovenia; Solomon Islands; South Africa; South Korea; South Sudan; Spain; Sudan; Suriname; Sweden; Switzerland; Syria; Tajikistan; Tanzania; Timor-Leste; Togo; Tonga; Trinidad and Tobago; Tunisia; Turkmenistan; Uganda; Ukraine; United Arab Emirates; United Kingdom; Uruguay; Uzbekistan; Vanuatu; Venezuela; Vietnam; Yemen; Zambia; Zimbabwe
- Depositary: Swiss Federal Council
- Languages: English; Arabic; Chinese; Spanish; French; Russian

Full text
- Geneva Convention/Protocol I at Wikisource

Protocol I to the Geneva Conventions (also Additional Protocol I or AP I) is a 1977 amendment or optional protocol to the Geneva Conventions of 1949 concerning the protection of civilian victims of international armed conflicts (including "armed conflicts in which peoples are fighting against colonial domination, alien occupation or racist regimes"). In practice, Additional Protocol I reaffirmed the international rules of war stipulated in the 1907 Hague Regulations and the four 1949 Geneva Conventions to accommodate developments of warfare since World War II.

As of June 2025, Additional Protocol I has been ratified by 175 states. The United States, Iran and Pakistan signed the protocol on 12 December 1977, but never ratified it. Israel, India and Turkey have not signed the protocol.

Some, but not all, of the provisions of the 1977 Additional Protocol I, “have obtained recognition as customary law.”

== Summary of provisions ==
Additional Protocol I contains 102 articles. The following is a basic overview of the Protocol. In general, Additional Protocol I reaffirms the provisions of the original four 1949 Geneva Conventions. However, the following additional protections are added:

- Article 1 states that the convention applies in "armed conflicts in which peoples are fighting against colonial domination and alien occupation and against racist regimes in the exercise of their right of self-determination."
- Article 15 states that civilian medical and religious personnel shall be respected and protected. This includes that Parties shall give all available help to civilian medical personnel.
- Articles 17 and 81 authorize the International Committee of the Red Cross, national societies, or other impartial humanitarian organizations to provide assistance to the victims of war.
- Article 35 bans weapons that "cause superfluous injury or unnecessary suffering," as well as means of warfare that “cause widespread, long-term, and severe damage to the natural environment."
- Article 37 prohibits perfidy (false declaration of truce). It identifies four types of perfidy and differentiates ruses of war from perfidy.
- Article 40 prohibits no quarter, i.e., to order that there shall be no survivors, to threaten as such, or to conduct hostilities on that basis.
- Article 42 outlaws attacks on pilots and aircrews who are parachuting from an aircraft in distress. Once they land in territory controlled by an adverse party, they must be given an opportunity to surrender before being attacked, unless it is apparent that they are engaging in a hostile act. Airborne troops, whether in distress or not, are not given the protection afforded by this article and may therefore be attacked during their descent.
- Article 43 deals with the identification of armed forces that are party to a conflict, and states that are combatants "shall be subject to an internal disciplinary system which, inter alia, shall enforce compliance with the rules of international law applicable in armed conflict."
- Article 47(1) provides that mercenaries "shall not have the right to be a combatant or a prisoner of war."
- Articles 51 and 54 outlaw indiscriminate attacks on civilian populations, and destruction of food sources, water, or other materials needed for survival. This includes directly attacking civilian (non-military) targets, but also using technologies whose scope of destruction cannot be limited. A total war that does not distinguish between civilian and military targets is considered a war crime.
- Article 53 prohibits attacks on historic monuments, works of art, and places of worship.
- Article 56 covers attacks on "works and installations containing dangerous forces," such as dams, dykes, and nuclear electrical generating stations. These targets as well as other military targets in their vicinity may not be attacked if they threaten the release of dangerous forces.
- Articles 76, 77 and 78, which comprise Chapter II, provide special protections for women and children. In particular, the death penalty shall not be executed on children under 18-years-old, and shall be avoided on pregnant women and mothers having dependent infants. Furthermore, children under 15-years-old shall not be recruited into the armed forces, and Parties shall take all reasonable measures to prevent them from taking part in hostilities.
- Article 79 states that journalists shall be considered as civilians and given the same protections. Civilian war correspondents attached to armed forces who are captured shall have the same rights as prisoners of war, as outlined in the Third Geneva Convention.
- Article 85(3f) prohibits the perfidious use of the red cross, red crescent, red lion and sun, or other protective signs recognized by the Geneva Conventions.
- Article 90 describes how international fact-finding commissions can be established in situations of serious violations of the Geneva Conventions.

== Ratification status ==
=== Israel ===
Israel has not ratified the Additional Protocol I to the Geneva Conventions. According to legal scholar and human rights attorney Noura Erakat, this allows the Israeli government to recognize the Israeli-Palestinian conflict as ''neither a civil war ('non-international armed conflict’ or NIAC) nor a war against a liberation movement ('international armed conflict’ or IAC).'' This way, force used by Palestinian factions can be deemed illegal and illegitimate.

=== Russia ===
On 16 October 2019, President Vladimir Putin signed an executive order and submitted a State Duma bill to revoke the statement accompanying Russia's ratification of the Additional Protocol I, which previously accepted the competence of the Article 90(2) International Fact-Finding Commission. The bill was supplied with the following warning:

Exceptional circumstances affect the interests of the Russian Federation and require urgent action. … In the current international environment, the risks of abuse of the commission's powers for political purposes by unscrupulous states who act in bad faith have increased significantly.

=== United States ===
The United States has not ratified the Additional Protocol I to the Geneva Conventions. Its main objection was to Article 1(4) (detailed below), regarding non-state actors.

== Background ==
The International Committee of the Red Cross (ICRC) brought a wide range of countries together to form the Diplomatic Conference on the Reaffirmation and Development of International Humanitarian Law Applicable in Armed Conflicts (the Diplomatic Conference). "After three years of deliberation, the Diplomatic Conference drafted and submitted Additional Protocols I and II to the 1949 Geneva Conventions."

== Article 1(4) ==
Article 1(4) of the Additional Protocol I states:

The situations referred to in the preceding paragraph include armed conflicts in which peoples are fighting against colonial domination and alien occupation and against racist regimes in the exercise of their right of self-determination.

Jan Arno Hessbruegge, who works at the New York Office of the United Nations High Commissioner for Human Rights, examined the three categories listed in his book Human Rights and Personal Self-defense in International Law:

- “Colonial domination" refers to far-away overseas colonies with clear geographical boundaries. It was not meant to apply to states conquering and annexing adjacent territories.
- “Alien occupation" refers to "cases where the occupied territory did not yet form part of a state at the time of occupation but was populated by a distinct group, such as the Palestinian people".
- “Racist regimes" included countries that had institutionalized racism, not countries where the government merely practices racial discrimination. At the time the protocol was written, this mainly referred to South Africa and Rhodesia.

Legal scholar Waldemar A. Solf opined that Article 1(4) of the Additional Protocol was largely symbolic and gave party states "a plausible basis for denying its application to their situation," while the states which the article most applied to (e.g. Israel and apartheid-era South Africa), would not sign the agreement at all.

The Reagan administration declared that Article 1(4) of the Additional Protocol I to the Geneva Conventions would "grant terrorists a psychological and legal victory," as it appears to grant combatant status to non-state actors, many of which (such as the Palestine Liberation Organization), have been designated as terrorist groups by the United States and other countries. By contrast, an article in the International Review of the Red Cross argues that this article, in fact, strengthens the fight against terrorism, by applying the laws of war (including all its prohibitions and obligations) to national wars of liberation. By granting combatant status to non-state actors in wars of liberation, it too requires non-state actors to follow the strict prohibitions against acts of terror (Articles 13, 51(2), etc.).

== Article 48 ==
Basic Rule

In order to ensure respect for and protection of the civilian population and civilian objects, the Parties to the conflict shall at all times distinguish between the civilian population and combatants and between civilian objects and military objectives and accordingly shall direct their operations only against military objectives.

== Article 51 ==
Protection of the Civilian Population

1. The civilian population and individual civilians shall enjoy general protections against dangers arising from military operations. To give effect to this protection, the following rules, which are additional to other applicable rules of international law, shall be observed in all circumstances.
2. The civilian population as such, as well as individual civilians, shall not be the object of attack.
3. Civilians shall enjoy the protection afforded by this Section, unless and for such time as they take a direct part in hostilities. Acts or threats of violence the primary purpose of which is to spread terror among the civilian population are prohibited.
4. Indiscriminate attacks are prohibited. Indiscriminate attacks are: (a) Those which are not directed at a specific military objective; (b) Those which employ a method or means of combat which cannot be directed at a specific military objective; (c) Those which employ a method or means of combat [that] strike military objectives and civilians or civilian objects without distinction.
5. Among others, the following types of attacks are to be considered as indiscriminate: (a) An attack by bombardment by any methods or means which treats as a single military objective a number of clearly separated and distinct military objectives; … and (b) An attack which may be expected to cause incidental loss of civilian life, injury to civilians, damage to civilian objects, or a combination thereof, which would be excessive in relation to the concrete and direct military advantage anticipated.

== Article 52 ==
General Protection of Civilian Objects

1. …
2. Attacks shall be limited strictly to military objectives. In so far as objects are concerned, military objectives are limited to those objects which by their nature, location, purpose or use make an effective contribution to military action and whose total or partial destruction, capture or neutralization, in the circumstances ruling at the time, offers a definite military advantage.
3. In case of doubt whether an object which is normally dedicated to civilian purposes, such as a place of worship, a house or other dwelling or a school, is being used to make an effective contribution to military action, it shall be presumed not to be so used.

== Article 57 ==
Precautions in Attack

1. In the conduct of military operations, constant care shall be taken to spare the civilian population, civilians and civilian objects.
2. With respect to attacks, the following precautions shall be taken: (a) Those who plan or decide upon an attack shall: (i) Do everything feasible to verify that the objectives to be attacked are neither civilians or civilian objects and are not subject to special protection but are military objectives within the meaning of paragraph 2 of Article 52 and that it is not prohibited by the provisions of this Protocol to attack them; (ii) Take all feasible precautions in the choice of means and methods of attack with a view to avoiding, and in any event minimizing, incidental loss of civilian life, injury to civilians and damage to civilian objects; (iii) Refrain from deciding to launch an attack which may be expected to cause incidental loss of civilian life, injury to civilians, damage to civilian objects, or a combination thereof, which would be excessive in relation to the concrete and direct military advantage anticipated; ….

== See also ==
- Geneva Conventions of 1949
- Third Geneva Convention, on the treatment of prisoners of war
- Fourth Geneva Convention, on the treatment of civilians during wartime
- Additional Protocol II, a 1977 amendment adopted relating to the protection of victims of non-international armed conflicts
- Additional Protocol III, a 2005 amendment adopted specifying the adoption of the Red Crystal emblem
- List of parties to the Geneva Conventions: includes a list of states that signed and a list of states that have ratified Protocol I
- Law of war, also known as the law of armed conflict and international humanitarian law (IHL)
- Distinction (law), the principle of distinction between combatants and civilians in armed conflict
