= Belligerent =

Warring party to military conflict

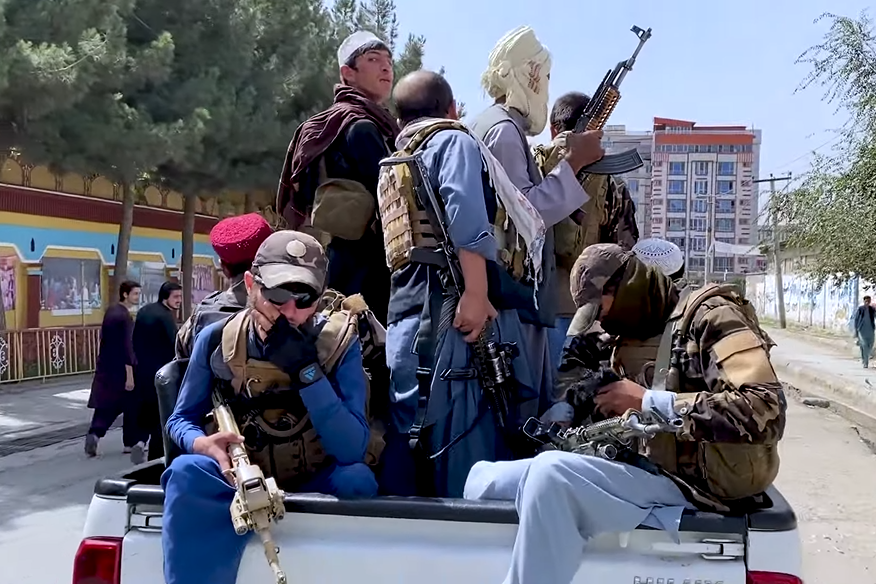
Armed transport in Taliban-controlled Kabul, August 2021

A belligerent is an individual, group, country, or other entity that acts in a hostile manner, such as engaging in combat. The term comes from the Latin bellum gerere (meaning "to wage war"). Unlike the use of belligerent as an adjective meaning "aggressive", its use as a noun does not necessarily imply that a belligerent country is an aggressor.

In times of war, belligerent countries can be contrasted with neutral countries and non-belligerents. However, the application of the laws of war to neutral countries and the responsibilities of belligerents are not affected by any distinction between neutral countries, neutral powers or non-belligerents.

== Belligerency ==
8th armored division soldiers in Holland, 1945

"Belligerency" is a term used in international law to indicate the status of two or more entities, generally sovereign states, being engaged in a war. Wars are often fought with one or both parties to a conflict invoking the right to self-defence under Article 51 of the United Nations Charter (as the United Kingdom did in 1982 before the start of the Falklands War) or under the auspices of a United Nations Security Council resolution (such as the United Nations Security Council Resolution 678, which gave legal authority for the Gulf War).

A state of belligerency may also exist between one or more sovereign states on one side and rebel forces, if such rebel forces are recognised as belligerents. If there is a rebellion against a constituted authority (for example, an authority recognised as such by the United Nations), and those taking part in the rebellion are not recognized as belligerents, the rebellion is an insurgency. Once the status of belligerency is established between two or more states, their relations are determined and governed by the laws of war.

== See also ==
- Combatant status
- Co-belligerence
- War of aggression
