= Carpet bombing =

Area bombardment technique

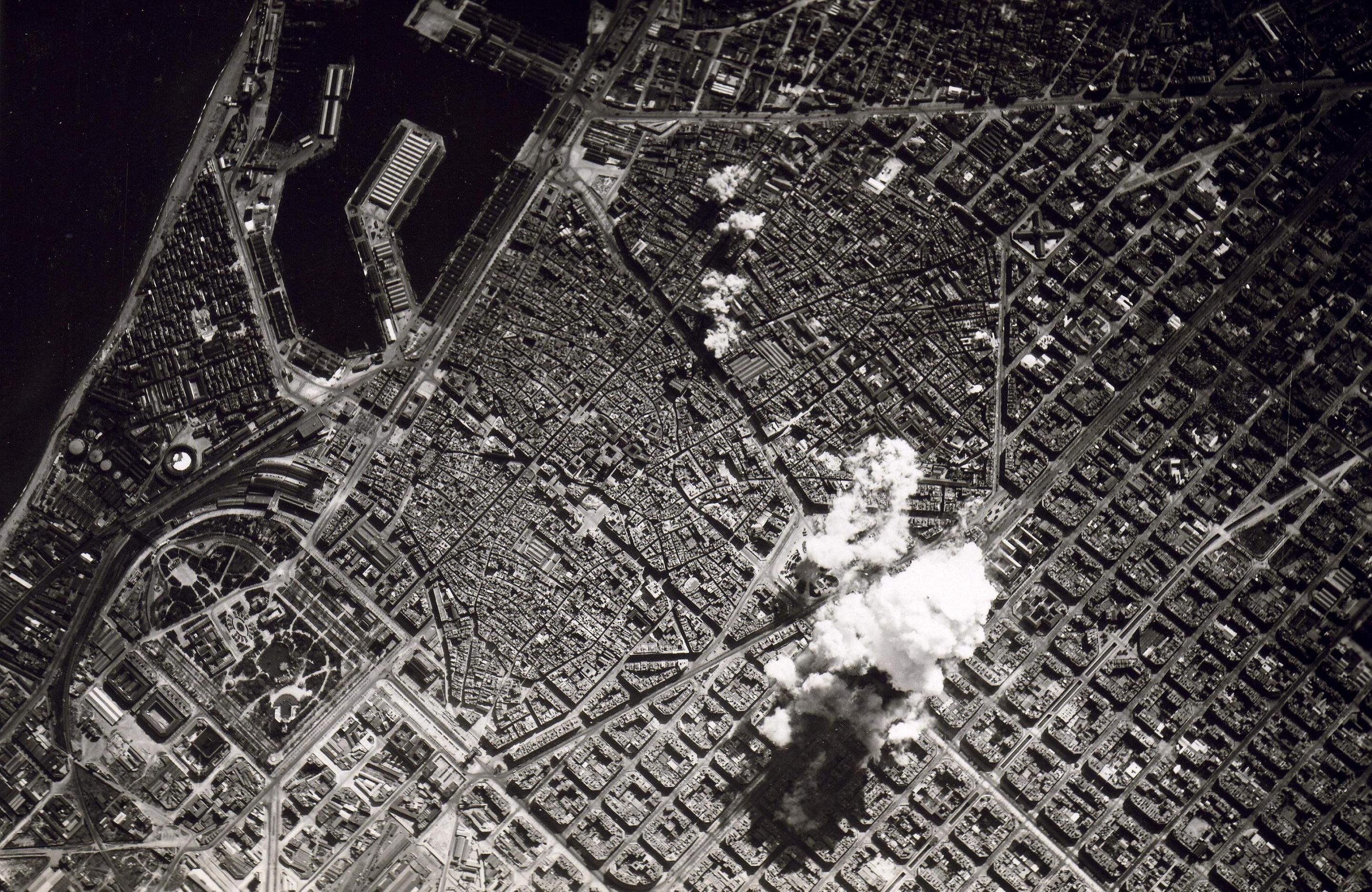
The first carpet bombing from air in history was the Bombing of Barcelona. 1,300 people were killed in 3 days, 16–18 March 1938

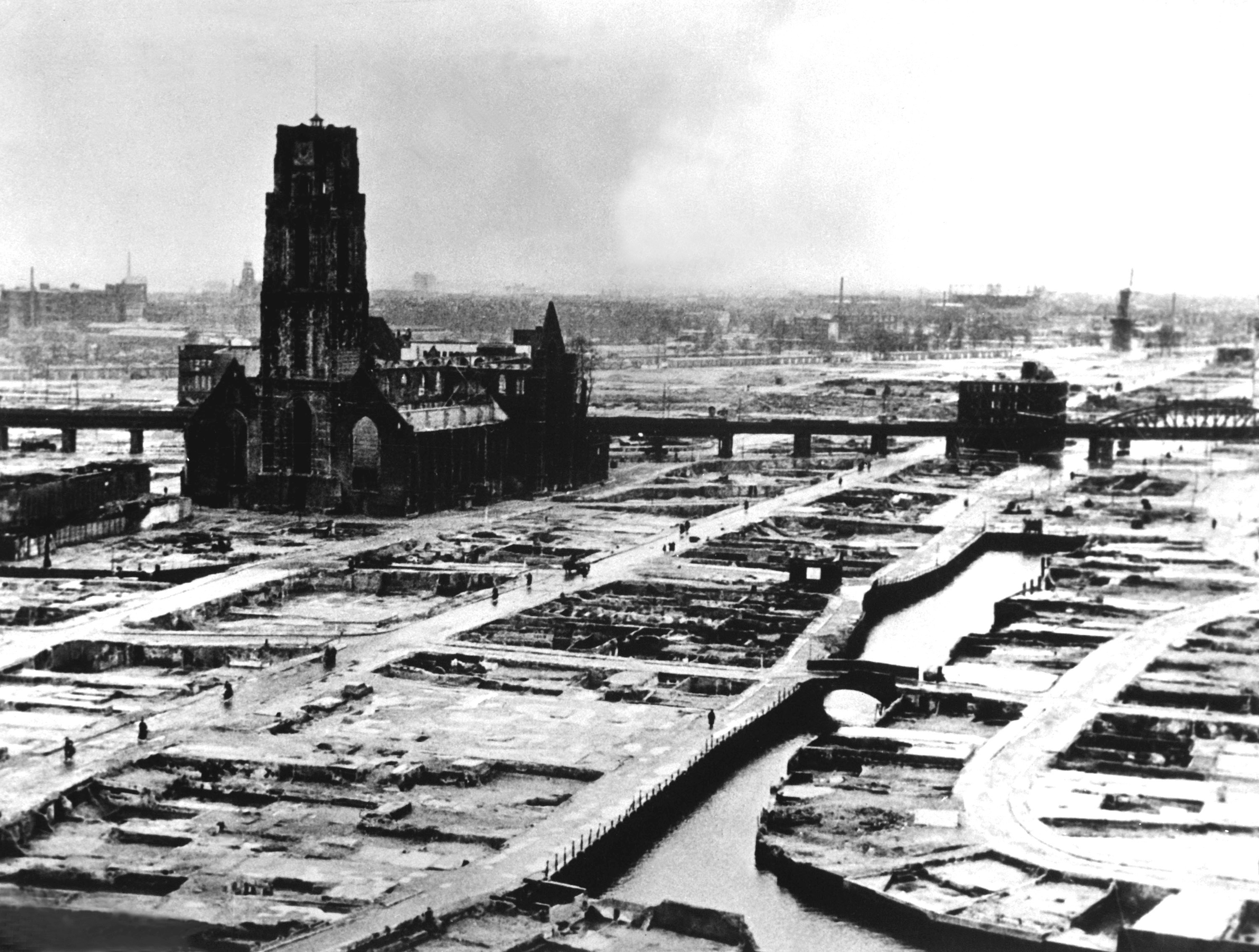
On 14 May 1940 at 1:22 pm, in the Rotterdam Blitz, German bombers set the entire inner city on fire with incendiary bombs, killing 814 inhabitants

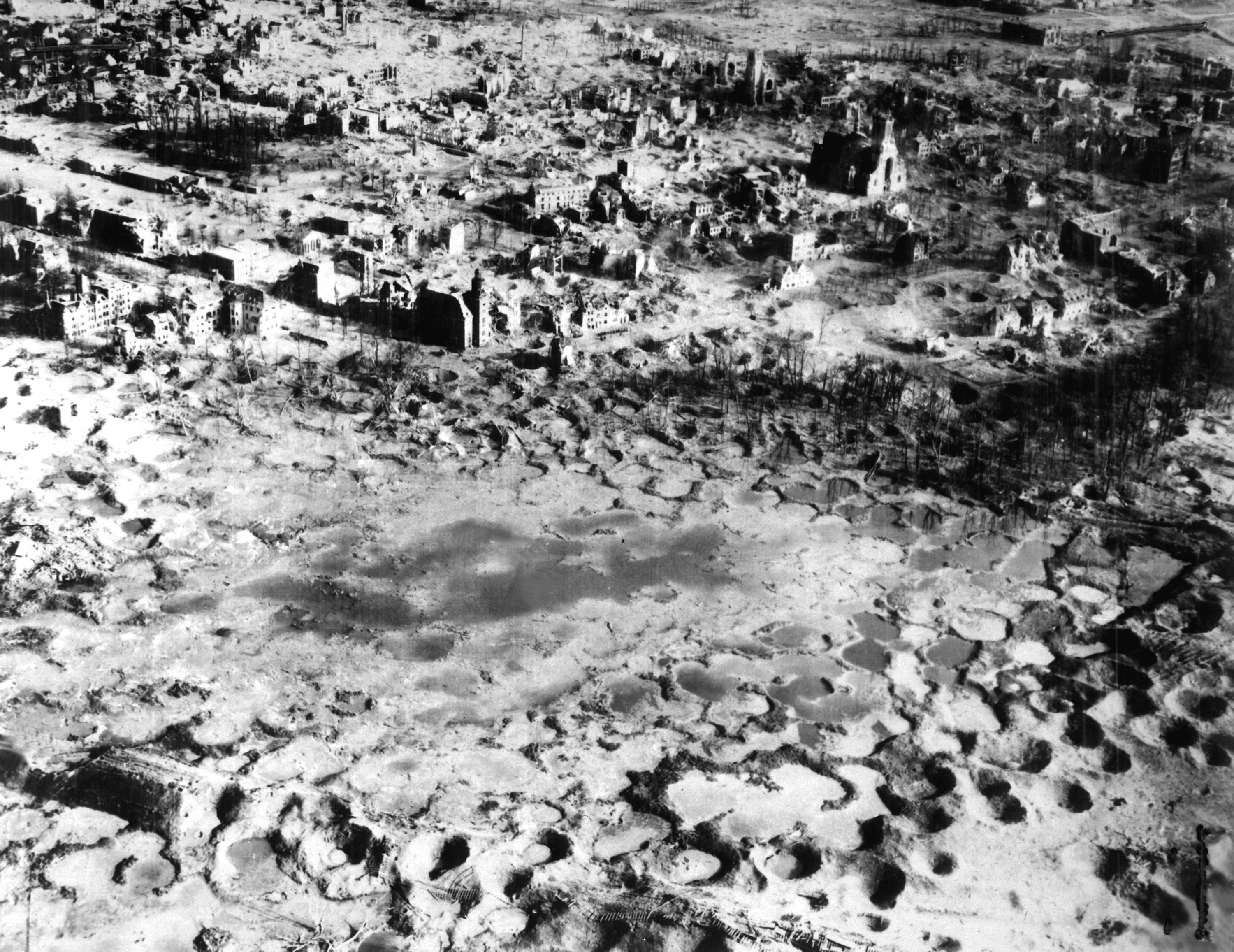
Wesel was 97% destroyed before it was finally taken by Allied troops in 1945

Carpet bombing, also known as "saturation bombing" and "obliteration bombing", is a large area bombardment done in a progressive manner to inflict damage in every part of a selected area of land. Carpet bombing refers to a type of area bombing that aims to effect complete destruction of the target area by exploding bombs in every part of it. The phrase evokes the image of explosions completely covering an area, in the same way that a carpet covers a floor. Carpet bombing is usually achieved by dropping many unguided bombs.

The term "obliteration bombing" is sometimes used to describe especially intensified bombing with the intention of destroying a city or a large part of a city. The term "area bombing" refers to indiscriminate bombing of an area and also encompasses cases of carpet bombing, including obliteration bombing. It was used in that sense especially during World War II and the Korean War. Area bombing is contrasted with precision bombing. The latter is directed at a selected target – not necessarily a small, and not necessarily a tactical target, as it could be an airfield or a factory – and it does not intend to inflict widespread damage. The term "area bombing" came into prominence during World War II.

Carpet bombing of cities, towns, villages or other areas containing a concentration of protected civilians has been considered a war crime since 1977, through Article 51 of Additional Protocol I of the Geneva Conventions.

== Early history ==
One of the first attempts at carpet bombing was at the Battle of El Mazuco during the Spanish Civil War in 1937, against widely-dispersed infantry on rocky slopes, and the attacking Condor Legion learned that carpet bombing was not very effective in such terrain.

In March 1938, the Bombing of Barcelona saw Italian and German airstrikes killing up to 1,300 people and wounding 2,000. It is considered the first carpet bombing of a city, and set a precedent for several such bombings in World War II.

The Japanese bombing of China's wartime capital Chongqing from 18 February 1938 to 23 August 1943 caused 23,600 deaths and over 30,000 wounded.

== During World War II ==
=== Pre-war expectation ===
In the inter-war years, a growing expectation developed that, on the outbreak of war, cities would be rapidly destroyed by bombing raids. The use of poison gas was expected and a high level of devastation was anticipated from high explosive bombs. This originated, in part, from the views of military experts such as Douhet, and was taken up by politicians and journalists, with, for example, Stanley Baldwin coining the phrase "The bomber will always get through". The targeting of the civilian population would, some theories suggested, cause a breakdown in morale that would lead to civil unrest that would compel a government to surrender. The combatant powers could, according to Baldwin, be in a competition to break the morale of the other side's civilian population first.

There were two results from this. Firstly, civil defence programs were set up, with gas masks being issued, plans for air raid shelters were set up and organizations to manage civilians before a raid and deal with damage and casualties after one were put in place. Secondly, agreements were sought to make the targeting of civilians illegal under international law. At the time that Douhet and others were publishing their ideas, no air force had planned their capabilities with the intent of making a "knockout blow" against civilian targets. The Hague Rules of Air Warfare were developed in 1922–23 to prevent deliberately attacking civilians, yet it was not ratified by any country. At the start of World War II, the Royal Air Force had an initial instruction to abide by the Hague Rules for as long as the enemy did. This restraint was followed by Britain until 11 May 1940, when, with Winston Churchill now in the role of Prime Minister and the war in France going badly, the RAF attacked industrial and transport infrastructure targets in Mönchengladbach. This raid caused civilian casualties.

=== Bombing by Germany ===
In the European theatre, the first city to suffer heavily from aerial bombardment was Warsaw, on 25 September 1939 following the start of the German invasion of Poland. Continuing this trend in warfare, the Rotterdam Blitz was an aerial bombardment of Rotterdam by 90 bombers of the German air force on 14 May 1940, during the German invasion of the Netherlands. The objective was to support the German assault on the city, break Dutch resistance, and force the Dutch to surrender. Despite a ceasefire, the bombing destroyed almost the entire historic city centre, killing nearly nine hundred civilians and leaving 30,000 people homeless. The destructive success of the bombing led the Oberkommando der Luftwaffe (OKL, the Luftwaffe High Command) to threaten to destroy the city of Utrecht if the Dutch Government did not surrender. The Dutch capitulated early the next morning.

As the war progressed, the Battle of Britain developed from a fight for air supremacy into the strategic and aerial bombing of London, Liverpool, Coventry and other British cities.

=== Bombing by the Western Allies ===
At the beginning of war, RAF Bomber Command lacked both the navigation systems for finding a target and the numbers of bombers that were needed to make attacks of any scale in Germany. As heavy bombers were brought into service and technology and tactics were improved, the selection of targets was changed. The intention of avoiding civilian casualties as collateral damage disappeared. Instead, the civilian population which worked in war-related industries—and their housing—became the target.

Some of this change came from a wish to retaliate for the German attack on Coventry. (Note: The war cabinet agreed, in November 1940, the indiscriminate bombing of a German city as retaliation for the German raid on Coventry.) It was also based on what was learnt from being the target in the Blitz. It had been found that factory buildings were more resistant to critical damage than the homes of their workers. Absenteeism of the workforce rose significantly if their housing was uninhabitable, so affecting industrial production. Whilst morale was still discussed, the meaning of the word changed from its pre-war usage. Now a reduction in morale was intended to reduce industrial production that supported the war effort. The area bombing directive was issued to RAF Bomber Command in 1942.

The Eighth Air Force of the USAAF arrived in Britain over the summer of 1942. Despite Roosevelt's pleas to Hitler to avoid bombing civilians prior to the United States joining the war, he was a supporter of bombing Germany. Both Churchill and Roosevelt were in the position that Stalin was pressing for the Western Allies to open a new front in Europe, something which they were not ready to do. Therefore a bombing campaign—the Combined Bomber Offensive—following the Casablanca directive to the Allied air forces was all they could offer to support the Soviet Union.

Operation Gomorrah, carried out by Bomber Command against Hamburg, targeted a city with both high susceptibility to fire and a large number of factories making products for the German war effort. The raid caused substantial damage to the city, especially the housing of industrial workers. A carefully developed mix of high explosive bombs and incendiaries was used. High explosives broke windows and made fire-fighting dangerous, whilst the incendiaries set the buildings on fire. This methodology was used for further attacks on urban areas (though not with such major effect) throughout the war, with Dresden being one of the final targets.

Carpet bombing was also used as close air support (as "flying artillery") for ground operations. The massive bombing was concentrated in a narrow and shallow area of the front (a few kilometers by a few hundred meters deep), closely coordinated with the advance of friendly troops. The first successful use of the technique was on 6 May 1943, at the end of the Tunisia Campaign. Carried out under Sir Arthur Tedder, it was hailed by the press as Tedder's bomb-carpet (or Tedder's carpet). The bombing was concentrated in a four by three-mile area, preparing the way for the First Army. This tactic was later used in many cases in the Normandy Campaign; for example, in the Battle for Caen.

=== Pacific War ===
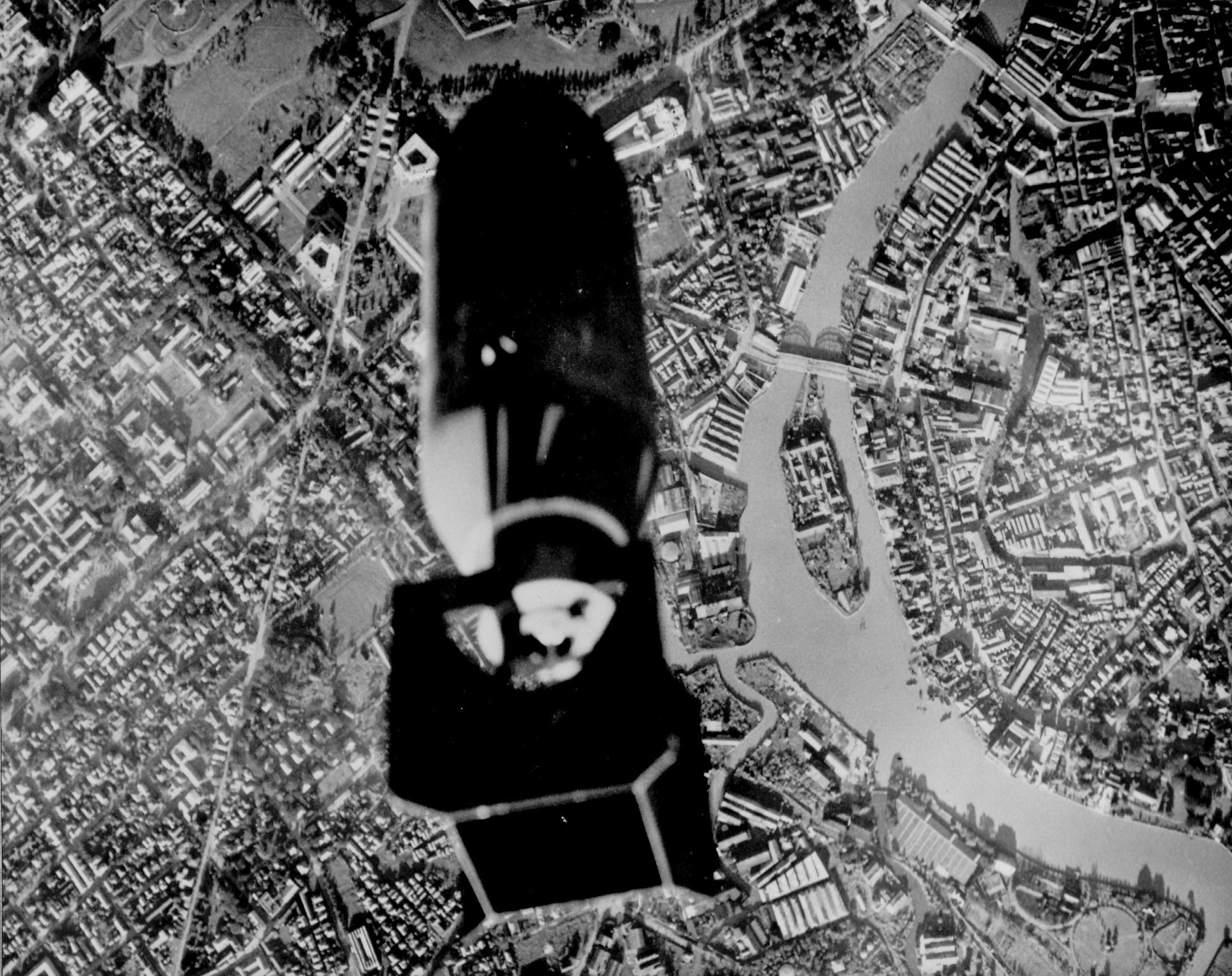
USS Essex TBF-1 Avenger dropping a bomb over the Pasig River in Manila targeting the dockyard, November 14, 1944

In the Pacific War, carpet bombing was used extensively against Japanese cities such as Tokyo. On the night of 9/10 March 1945, 334 B-29 Superfortress heavy bombers were directed to attack the most heavily populated civilian sectors of Tokyo. In just one night, over 100,000 people burned to death from a heavy bombardment of incendiary bombs, comparable to the wartime number of U.S. casualties in the entire Pacific theater. Another 100,000 to one million Japanese were left homeless. These attacks were followed by similar ones against Kobe, Osaka and Nagoya, as well as other sectors of Tokyo, where over 9,373 tons of incendiary bombs were dropped on civilian and military targets. By the time of the dropping of the atomic bombs on Hiroshima and Nagasaki, light and medium bombers were being directed to bomb targets of convenience, as most urban areas had already been destroyed. In the nine-month long bombing campaign, over 300,000 Japanese civilians died and 400,000 were wounded.

During the final months of the war in the Philippines, the United States military used carpet bombing against the Japanese forces in Manila and Baguio, reducing much of the cities to rubble. Manila became the second-most-destroyed city of World War II.

== Korean War ==
From June 1950, air forces of the United Nations Command began an extensive bombing campaign against North Korea that lasted until the end of the Korean War in July 1953. The American strategic bombing campaign destroyed 85 percent of North Korea's buildings and 95 percent of its power generation. Conventional weapons such as explosives, incendiary bombs and napalm destroyed nearly all of Korea's cities and towns. By the end of the war, 18 of the 22 major cities in North Korea had been at least half obliterated according to damage assessments by the United States Air Force (USAF).

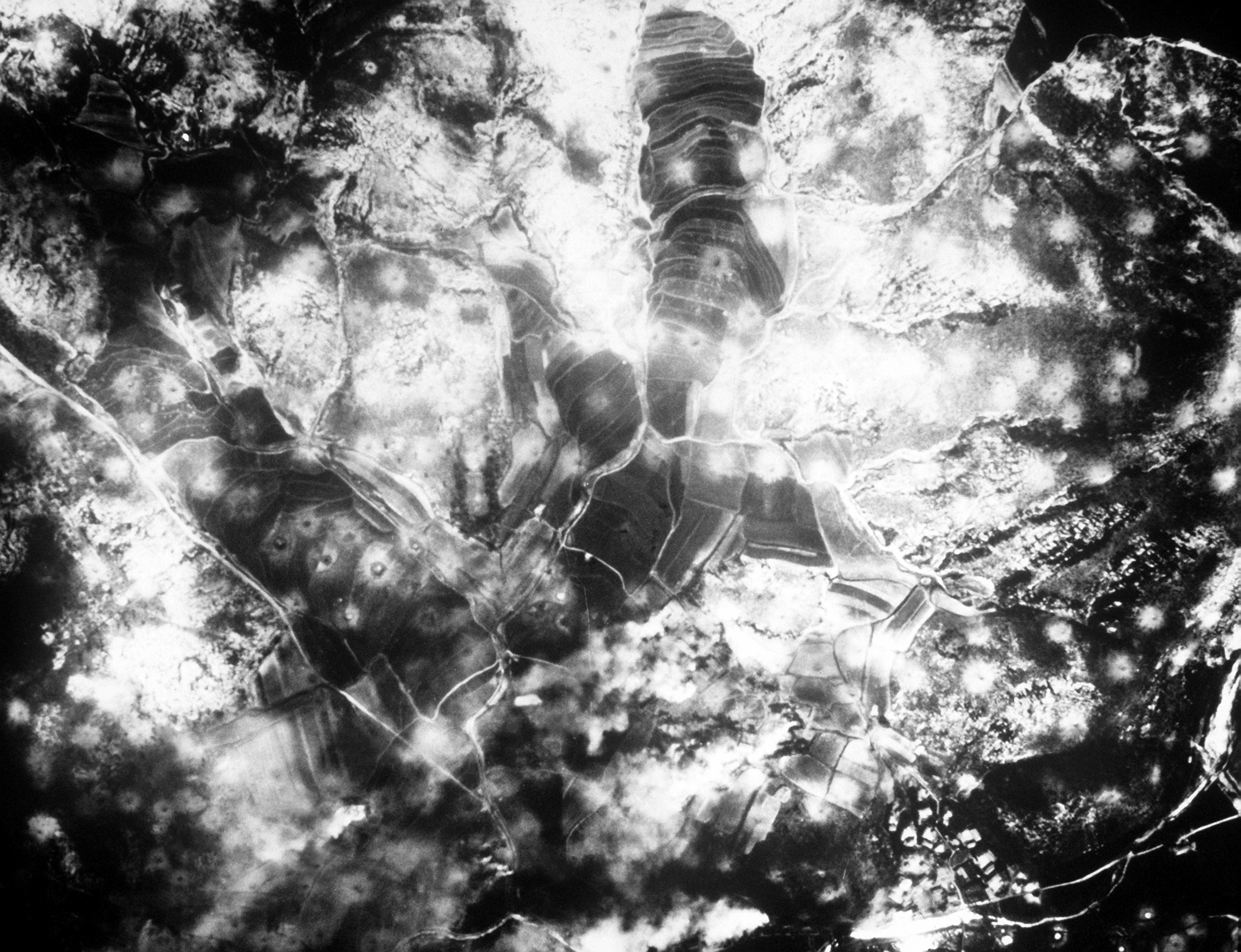
Photo of bombing of Waegwan, 1950

Between June and October 1950, USAF Far East Air Force (FEAF) B-29 bombers carried out massive aerial attacks on transport centers and industrial hubs in North Korea. Having soon established air supremacy by the destruction of the Korean People's Army Air and Anti-Air Force in the air and on the ground, FEAF bombers encountered no resistance and "the sky over North Korea was their safe front yard". On 3 November, General Douglas MacArthur agreed for the first time to a firebombing campaign, agreeing to General George E. Stratemeyer's request to burn Kanggye and several other towns in North Korea. That evening, MacArthur's chief of staff told Stratemeyer that the firebombing of Sinuiju had also been approved. Stratemeyer sent orders to the Fifth Air Force and Bomber Command to

"destroy every means of communications and every installation, factory, city, and village".

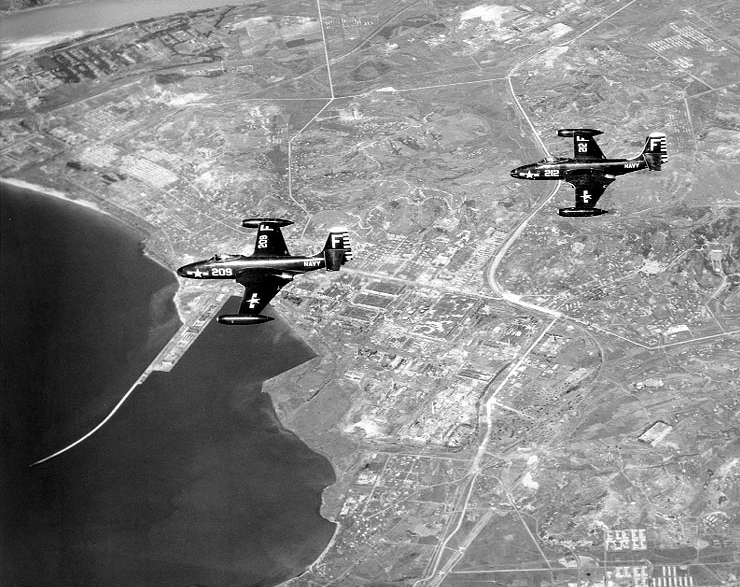
F2H-2 Banshees over Hungnam, which had been 85% destroyed, on Armistice-eve, July 26, 1953

On 5 November, twenty-two B-29s attacked Kanggye, destroying 75 percent of the city. After the failure of the Chinese Fifth Phase Offensive and the UN May–June 1951 counteroffensive, from July 1951, while the ground war became static when the UN and the PVA/KPA fought but exchanged little territory, large-scale bombing of North Korea continued.

North Korea suffered heavy damage from US bombing. Major General William F. Dean, the highest-ranking American POW from the war, reported that the majority of North Korean cities and villages he saw were either rubble or snow-covered wasteland. North Korean factories, schools, hospitals, and government offices were forced to move underground, and air defenses were "non-existent". North Korea ranks as among the most heavily bombed countries in history, as the US dropped a total of 635,000 tons of bombs (including 32,557 tons of napalm) on Korea, more than during the entire Pacific War.

== Vietnam War ==
During the Vietnam War, with the escalating situation in Southeast Asia, 28 B-52Fs were fitted with external racks for twenty-four 750-pound (340 kg) bombs under project South Bay in June 1964; an additional 46 aircraft received similar modifications under project Sun Bath. In March 1965, the United States commenced Operation Rolling Thunder. The first combat mission, Operation Arc Light, was flown by B-52Fs on 18 June 1965, when thirty bombers of the 9th and 441st Bombardment Squadrons struck a communist stronghold near the Bến Cát District in South Vietnam. The first wave of bombers arrived too early at a designated rendezvous point, and while maneuvering to maintain station, two B-52s collided, which resulted in the loss of both bombers and eight crewmen. The remaining bombers, minus one more that turned back for mechanical problems, continued toward the target. Twenty-seven Stratofortresses dropped on a one-by-two-mile (1.6-by-3.2-kilometre) target box from between 19,000 and 22,000 feet (5,800 and 6,700 m), a little more than 50 percent of the bombs falling within the target zone. The force returned to Andersen AFB except for one bomber with electrical problems that recovered to Clark AFB, the mission having lasted thirteen hours. Post-strike assessment by teams of South Vietnamese troops with American advisors found evidence that the VC had departed the area before the raid, and it was suspected that infiltration of the South's forces may have tipped off the north because of the ARVN troops involved in the post-strike inspection.

The B-52s were restricted to bombing suspected Communist bases in relatively uninhabited sections, because their potency approached that of a tactical nuclear weapon. A formation of six B-52s, dropping their bombs from 30,000 feet (9,100 m), could "take out"… almost everything within a "box" approximately five-eighths mile (1.0 km) wide by two miles (3.2 km) long. Whenever Arc Light struck… in the vicinity of Saigon, the city woke from the tremor….

— Neil Sheehan, war correspondent, writing before the mass attacks to heavily populated cities including North Vietnam's capital.

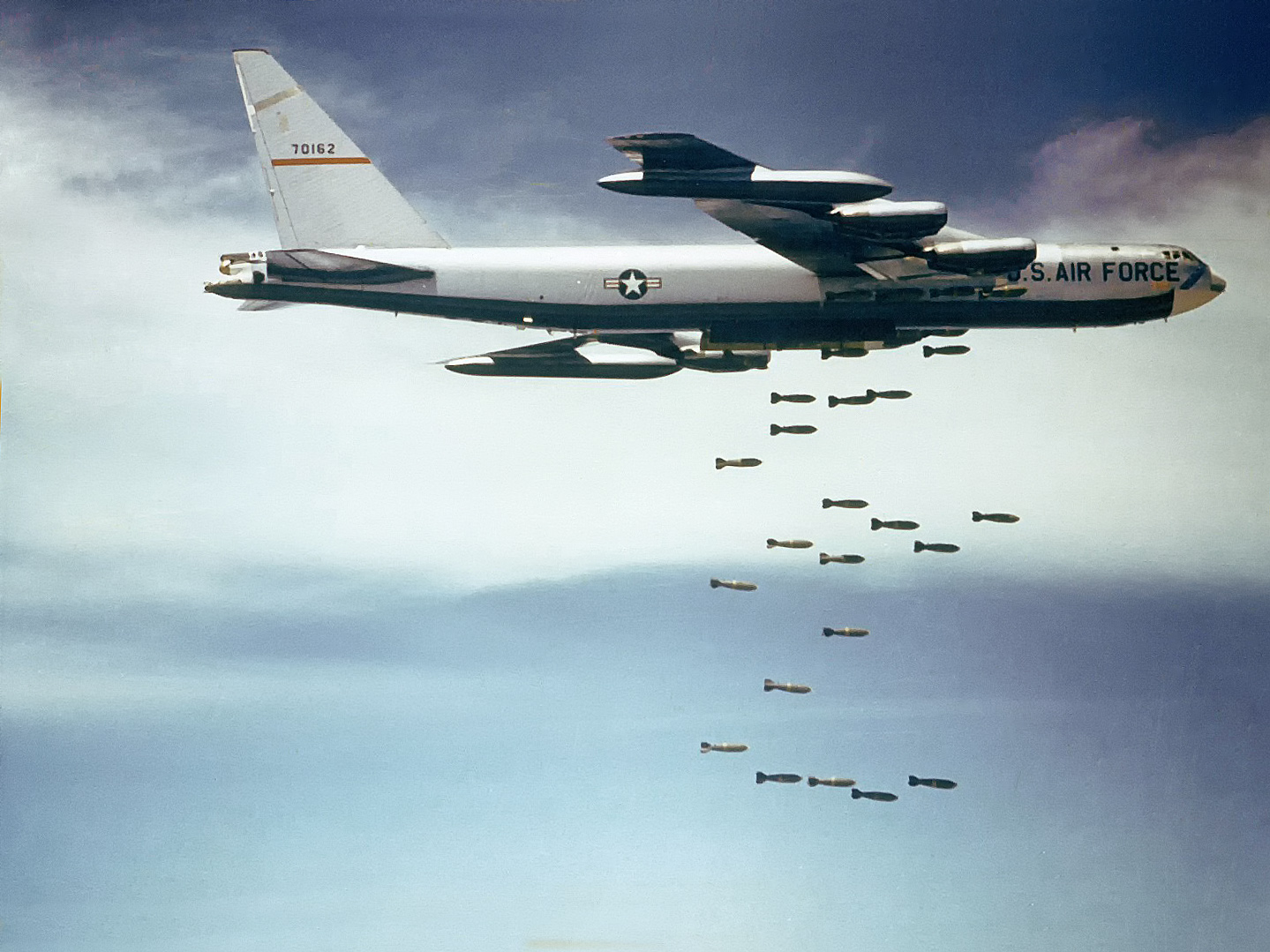
A Boeing B-52F Stratofortress releasing its payload of bombs over Vietnam

Beginning in late 1965, a number of B-52Ds underwent Big Belly modifications to increase bomb capacity for carpet bombings. While the external payload remained at twenty-four 500-pound (227 kg) or 750-pound (340 kg) bombs, the internal capacity increased from twenty-seven to eighty-four 500-pound bombs or from twenty-seven to forty-two 750-pound bombs. The modification created enough capacity for a total of 60,000 pounds (27,215 kg) in 108 bombs. Thus modified, B-52Ds could carry 22,000 pounds (9,980 kg) more than B-52Fs. Designed to replace B-52Fs, modified B-52Ds entered combat in April 1966 flying from Andersen Air Force Base, Guam. Each bombing mission lasted ten to twelve hours with an aerial refueling by KC-135 Stratotankers. In spring 1967, the aircraft began flying from U-Tapao Airfield in Thailand giving the aircraft the advantage of not requiring in-flight refueling.

The bread and butter of B-52 attacks in Vietnam was Operation Linebacker II (sometimes referred to as the Christmas Bombing) which consisted of waves of B-52s (mostly D models, but some Gs without jamming equipment and with a smaller bomb load). Over twelve days, B-52s flew 729 sorties and dropped 15,237 tons of bombs on Hanoi, Haiphong and other targets. Originally 42 B-52s were committed to the war; however, numbers were frequently twice this figure.

== Gaza war ==
During the Gaza war that began in October 2023, the scale of Israeli airstrikes drew increasing international condemnation.

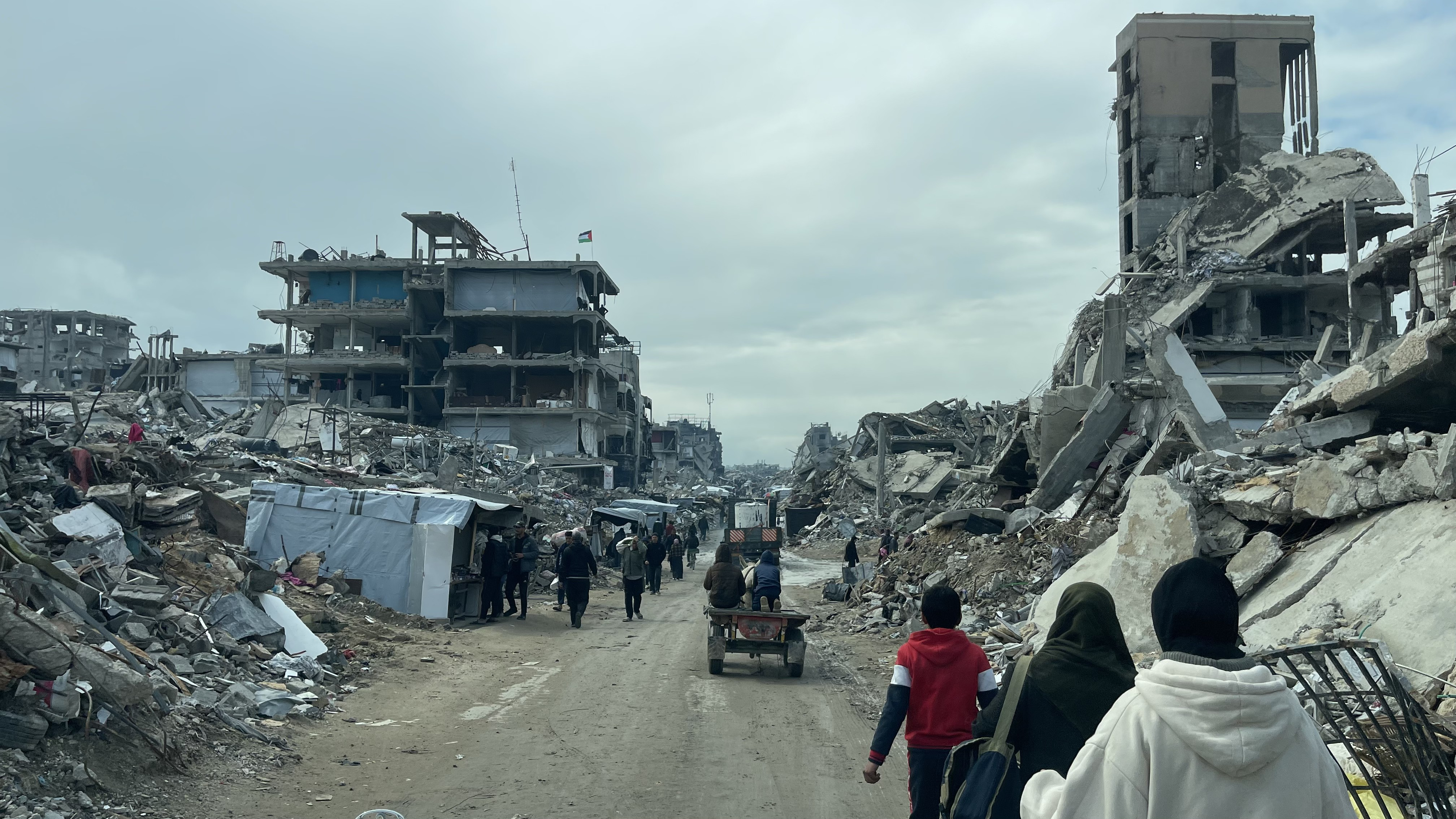
Palestinians in the ruins of Beit Lahia, February 2025

By October 2024, Israel said it bombed 40,000 locations in the Gaza Strip (which is 360 km^{2}). By one estimate, the bomb tonnage dropped on Gaza is more than 70,000 tonnes, which academic Robert Pape noted surpassed the combined bomb tonnage dropped on Dresden, Hamburg, and London in World War II. He also stated that "Gaza will also go down as a place name denoting one of history's heaviest conventional bombing campaigns." Satellite imagery showed at least 69% of all buildings were damaged or destroyed, which surpasses the scale of destruction in Cologne and Dresden and approaches that of Hamburg during World War II.

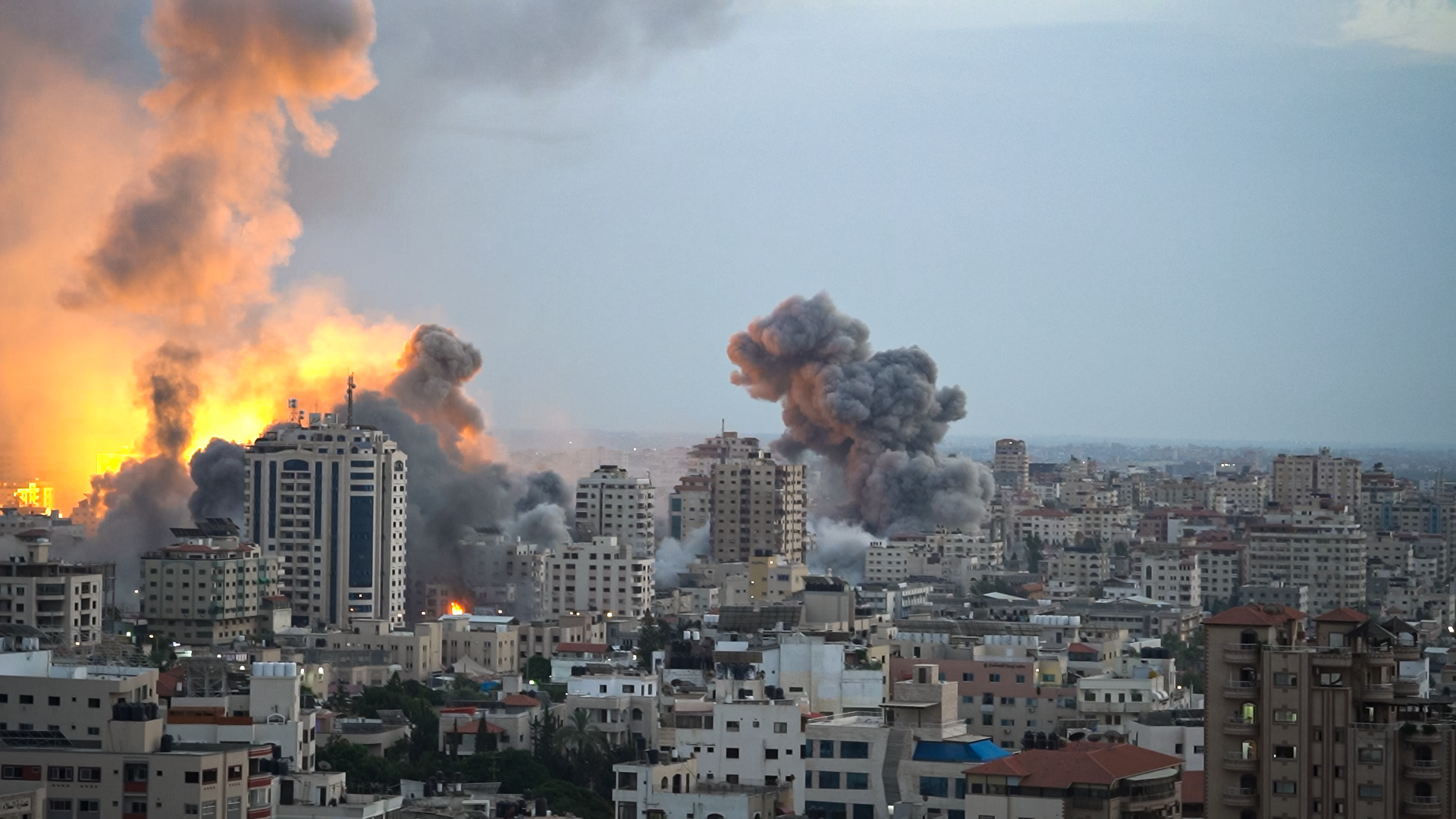
Israeli bombing of Gaza City

Scholars termed the destruction of Gaza a domicide, leading the UN special rapporteur on the right to housing to argue that international law should be amended to consider domicide a war crime. Israel's airstrikes were described as a carpet bombing and "indiscriminate". An US intelligence report found half of the bombs dropped on Gaza had been unguided bombs. Experts stated the bombing campaign against Gaza had been among the deadliest and most destructive in modern history, with Corey Scher of the CUNY Graduate Center saying that "Gaza is now a different color from space." Several months later, Scher, who was involved with mapping the destruction in Gaza, stated, "The rate of damage being registered is unlike anything we have studied before. It is much faster and more extensive than anything we have mapped".

The Wall Street Journal termed Israel's bombing the "most devastating urban warfare in the modern record". According to analysis by Humanity & Inclusion, approximately 45,000 bombs were dropped on the Gaza Strip in the conflict's first three months, but with a 9% to 14% failure rate, several thousand unexploded bombs lay amongst the ruins. The United Nations Mine Action Service estimated that there was more rubble in Gaza (25 miles long) than in all of Ukraine (600 miles long), with the rubble in Gaza likely "heavily contaminated" by unexploded ordnance. In June 2024, scholars referred to the bombing of Gaza as an example of urbicide, or the "deliberate, widespread destruction of the urban environment".

== See also ==
- Aerial bombardment and international law
- Aerial bombing of cities
- Area bombardment
- Bombing of Warsaw in World War II
- Churchill's advocacy of chemical strike against German cities
- Civilian casualties of strategic bombing
- Giulio Douhet, an early theorist of bombing
- Roerich Pact
- Strategic bombing
- Tactical bombing
- Terror bombing
- War crimes
