= High level bombing =

Tactic of dropping bombs from a high altitude

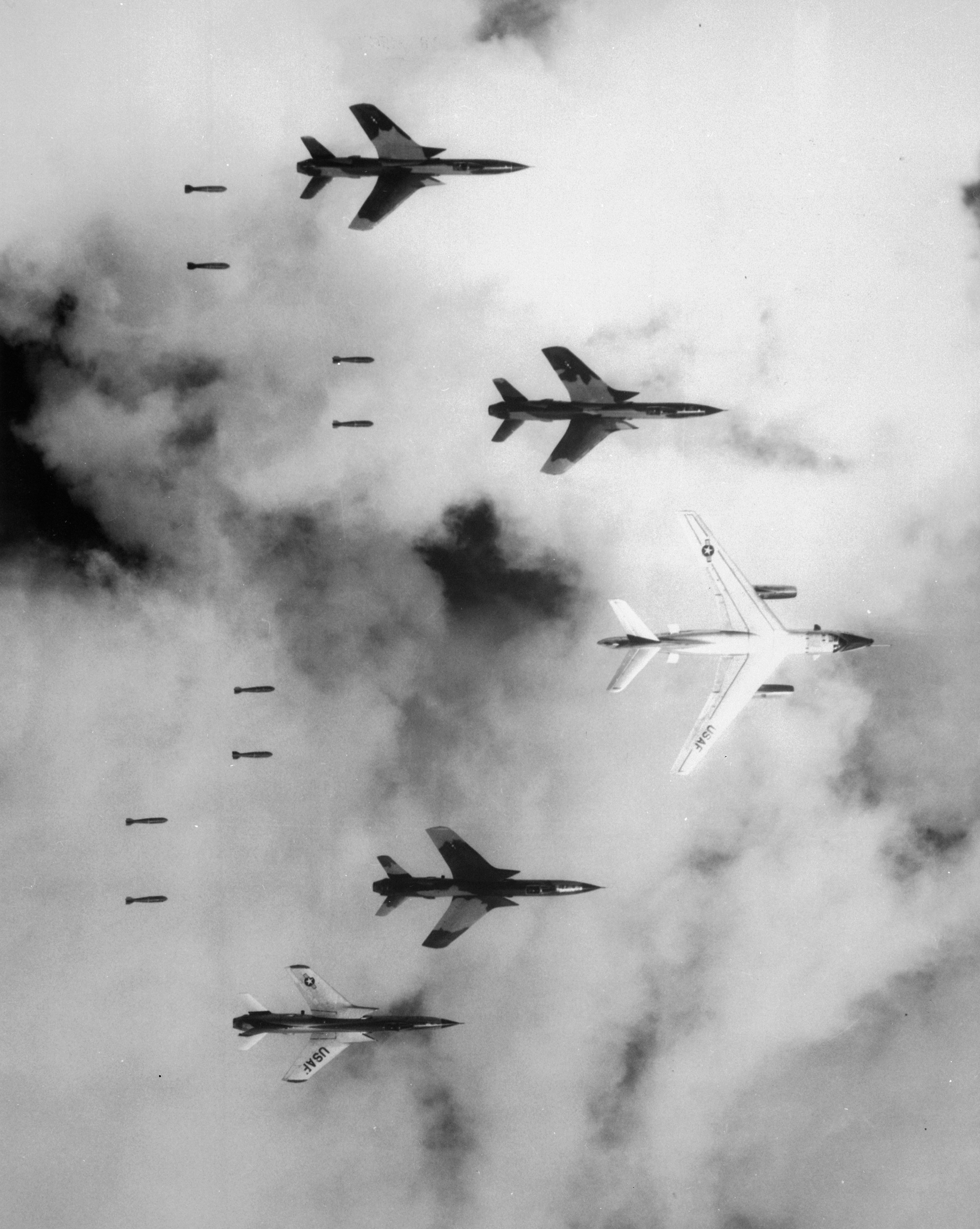
USAF high level bombing through clouds over North Vietnam, 14 June 1966. An EB-66 tactical jamming aircraft leads four F-105 fighter-bombers as a Pathfinder. Also called synchronous radar bombing or buddy bombing, this method required the EB-66 navigator to use his K-5 radar bombing navigation system to detect the target and send a signal tone to the F-105s to drop their bombs. Throughout the bombing run, the Pathfinder employed its S-band jammers to suppress radar-controlled anti-aircraft guns. Radar film coverage from Pathfinder missions was accumulated by the USAF for more sophisticated and refined targeting, bomb damage assessment and photographic reconnaissance of North Vietnam.

High level bombing (also called high-altitude bombing) is a tactic of fixed-wing bomber aircraft in level flight dropping aerial bombs from high altitude. The term is used to contrast with both World War II-era dive bombing and modern medium/low-altitude close air support bombing, in both of which the attacking aircraft is directly subjected to anti-aircraft fire from the ground.

Prior to the modern age of precision-guided munitions (PGMs), high level bombing was primarily used for strategic bombing — a form of indiscriminate area bombardment of cities and industrial estates aiming to inflict mass damage and psychological stress on the enemy's home front economy and population — not for attacks on specific front line or rear targets on the battlefield. High level bombing missions have been flown by many different types of aircraft, including medium bombers, heavy bombers, strategic bombers and fighter-bombers.

The choice to use high level bombing as an offensive tactic of aerial warfare is dependent not only upon the inherent accuracy and effectiveness of the bombing aircraft and their delivered ordnance on the target, but also upon a target's air defense capabilities. From the 1940s onward, radar in particular became a powerful new defensive early warning tool, and a serious threat to attacking aircraft when they flew at higher altitudes towards their target.

Bombing from medium to high altitudes, especially in the post-World War II era with sophisticated surface-to-air missiles, interceptor aircraft and radars exposes attacking bomber aircraft to greater risks of detection, interception and destruction. During World War II, various methods were employed to protect high level bombers from flak, fighter aircraft and radar detection, including defensive armament, escort fighters, chaff and electronic jamming. Modern stealth aircraft technologies, for example, can alleviate some risks inherent to high level bombing missions, but are not a guarantee of success or permanent solution for the attackers.

== World War II ==
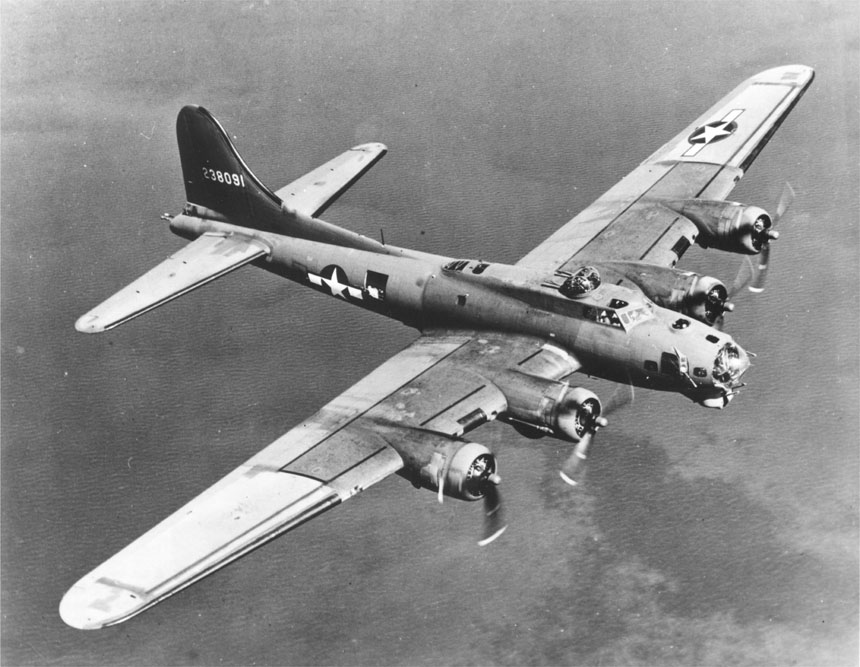
The B-17 Flying Fortress, a famous World War II heavy bomber and high level bomber

High level bombers were primarily used by the Allies for carpet bombing (particularly later in the war), such as the bombing of Dresden or Tokyo. They were also deployed in other kinds of missions such as Operation Tidal Wave, Operation Crossbow, and the sinking of the Tirpitz.

After initial operations by day suffered heavy losses, the British switched to night-time sorties where the darkness gave some protection against German fighters. Arthur "Bomber" Harris's strategy for the RAF Bomber Command was to attack area targets that the bombers could be more certain of hitting at night, while the U.S. preferred daylight, precision bombing techniques. The development since the 1930s of gyroscope-stabilised optical bombsights, such as the Norden bombsight, also helped the Allied air forces' ability to accurately strike their targets with medium- to high-altitude level bombing attacks.

Nazi Germany used high level bombers such as the Heinkel He 111, the Dornier Do 17 and multi-role aircraft such as the Junkers Ju 88 against the Allies in the Battle of Britain, both for carpet bombing and for precision attacks on British radar stations as part of Operation Eagle.

== Cold War ==
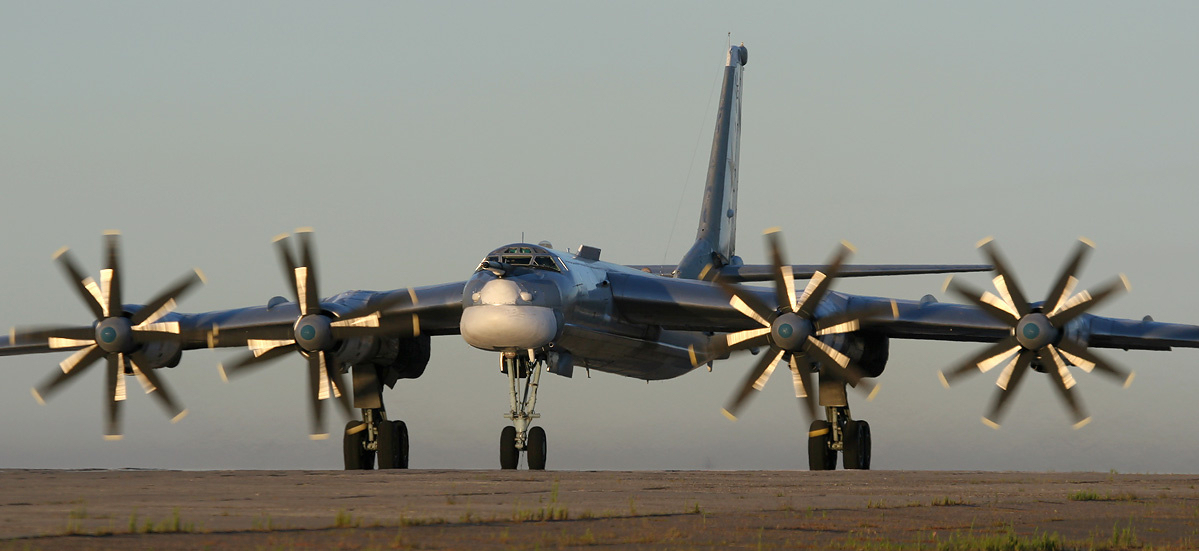
The Tu-95 Bear, a Soviet Cold War-era strategic bomber and high level bomber

During the Cold War, the United States and Soviet Union used several bomber designs, but the bulk of their offensive forces were in the form of, respectively, the B-52 Stratofortress and Tu-95 Bear. The French equivalent was the Mirage IV, and the UK had its V bombers.

The U.S. Strategic Air Command (SAC) ordered massive high level bombing in Operation Rolling Thunder and Operation Menu during the Vietnam War.

== See also ==
- Attack aircraft
- Fighter-bomber
- Heavy bomber
- Light bomber
- Medium bomber
- Schnellbomber
- Strategic bombing
