= Aerial bombardment and international law =

Air warfare must comply with laws and customs of war, including international humanitarian law by protecting the victims of the conflict and refraining from attacks on protected persons.

These restraints on aerial warfare are covered by the general laws of war, because unlike war on land and at sea—which are specifically covered by rules such as the 1907 Hague Convention and Protocol I additional to the Geneva Conventions, which contain pertinent restrictions, prohibitions and guidelines—there are no treaties specific to aerial warfare.

To be legal, aerial operations must comply with the principles of humanitarian law: military necessity, distinction, and proportionality: An attack or action must be intended to help in the military defeat of the enemy; it must be an attack on a military objective; and the harm caused to protected civilians or civilian property must be proportionate and not excessive in relation to the concrete and direct military advantage anticipated.

== International law up to 1945 ==
Before and during World War II (1939–1945), international law relating to aerial bombardment rested on the treaties of 1864, 1899, and 1907, which constituted the definition of most of the laws of war at that time – which, despite repeated diplomatic attempts, was not updated in the immediate run-up to World War II. The most relevant of these treaties is the Hague Convention of 1907 because it was the last treaty ratified before 1939 which specified the laws of war regarding the use of bombardment. In the Hague Convention of 1907, two treaties have a direct bearing on the issue of bombardment. These are "Laws of War: Laws and Customs of War on Land (Hague IV); 18 October 1907" and "Laws of War: Bombardment by Naval Forces in Time of War (Hague IX); 18 October 1907". It is significant that there is a different treaty which should be invoked for bombardment of land by land (Hague IV) and of land by sea (Hague IX). Hague IV, which reaffirmed and updated Hague II (1899), contains the following clauses:

- Article 25: The attack or bombardment, by whatever means, of towns, villages, dwellings, or buildings which are undefended is prohibited.
- Article 26: The officer in command of an attacking force must, before commencing a bombardment, except in cases of assault, do all in his power to warn the authorities.
- Article 27: In sieges and bombardments all necessary steps must be taken to spare, as far as possible, buildings dedicated to religion, art, science, or charitable purposes, historic monuments, hospitals, and places where the sick and wounded are collected, provided they are not being used at the time for military purposes. It is the duty of the besieged to indicate the presence of such buildings or places by distinctive and visible signs, which shall be notified to the enemy beforehand.

Although the 1907 Hague Conventions IV – The Laws and Customs of War on Land and IX – Bombardment by Naval Forces in Time of War prohibited the bombardment of undefended places, there was no international prohibition against indiscriminate bombardment of non-combatants in defended places, a shortcoming in the rules that was greatly exacerbated by aerial bombardment.

The attendees of the Second Hague Conference in 1907 did adopt a "Declaration Prohibiting the Discharge of Projectiles and Explosives from Balloons" on 18 October 1907. It stated: "The Contracting Powers agree to prohibit, for a period extending to the close of the Third Peace Conference, the discharge of projectiles and explosives from balloons or by other new methods of a similar nature." The foreshadowed "Third Peace Conference" never took place, and the Declaration remains in force. The United Kingdom and the United States ratified the Declaration.

With the rise of aerial warfare, non-combatants became extremely vulnerable and inevitably became collateral targets in such warfare – potentially on a much larger scale than previously.

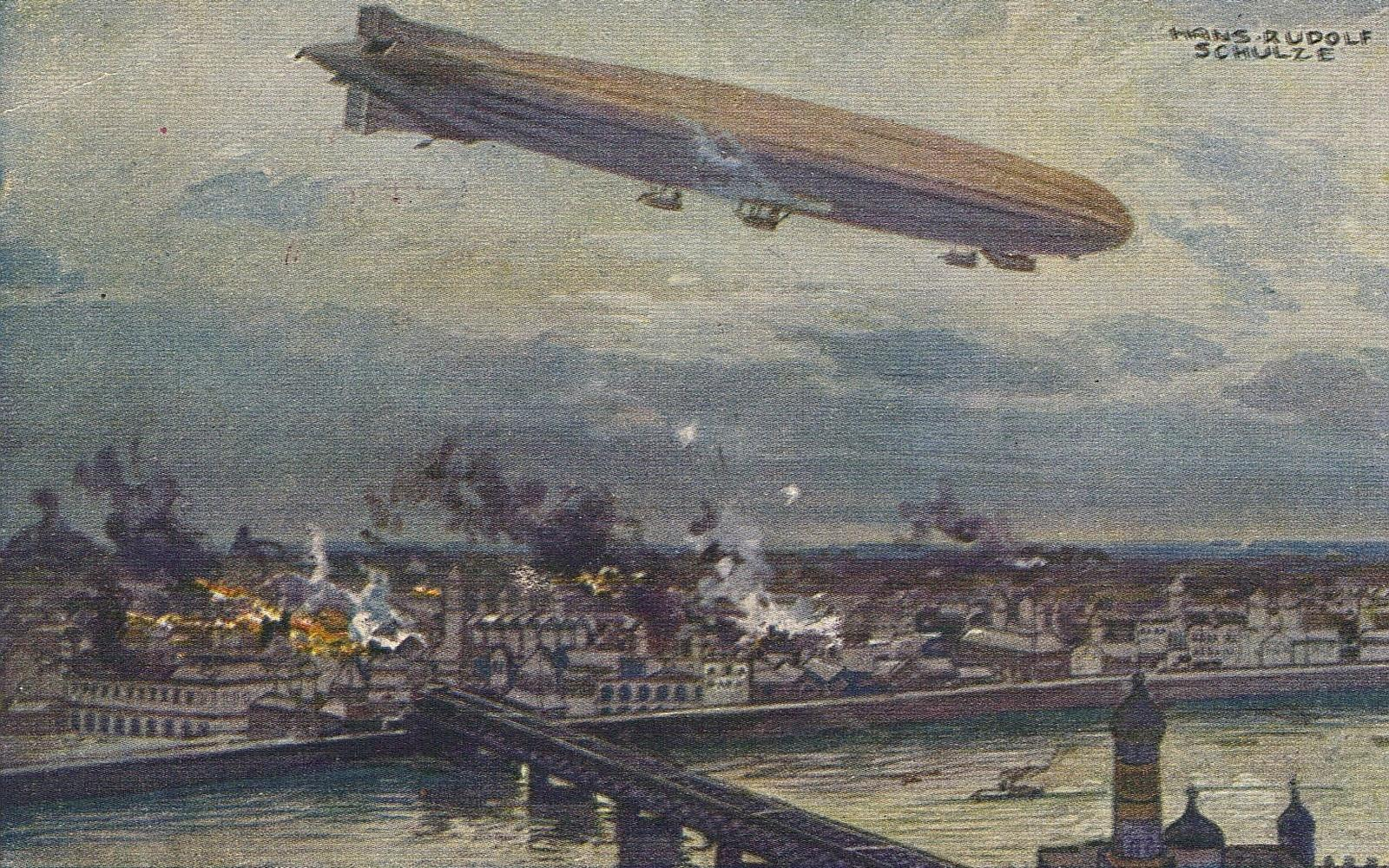
German airship Schütte Lanz SL2 bombing Warsaw in 1914

World War I (1914-1918) saw the first use of strategic bombing when German Zeppelins and aircraft indiscriminately dropped bombs on cities in Britain and France. These nations, fighting against Germany and its allies in the war, retaliated with their own air-raids (see Strategic bombing during World War I). A few years after World War I, a draft convention was proposed in 1923: The Hague Rules of Air Warfare. The draft contained a number of articles which would have directly affected how militaries used aerial bombardment and defended against it: articles 18, 22 and 24. The law was, however, never adopted in legally binding form as all major powers criticized it as being unrealistic.

The Greco-German arbitration tribunal of 1927–1930 arguably established the subordination of the law of air warfare to the law of ground warfare. It found that the 1907 Hague Convention on "The Laws and Customs of War on Land" applied to the German attacks in Greece during World War I: This concerned both Article 25 and Article 26.

Jefferson Reynolds in an article in The Air Force Law Review argues that "if international law is not enforced, persistent violations can conceivably be adopted as customary practice, permitting conduct that was once prohibited." Even if the Greco-German arbitration tribunal findings had established the rules for aerial bombardment, by 1945, the belligerents of World War II had ignored the preliminary bombardment procedures that the Greco-German arbitration tribunal had recognized.

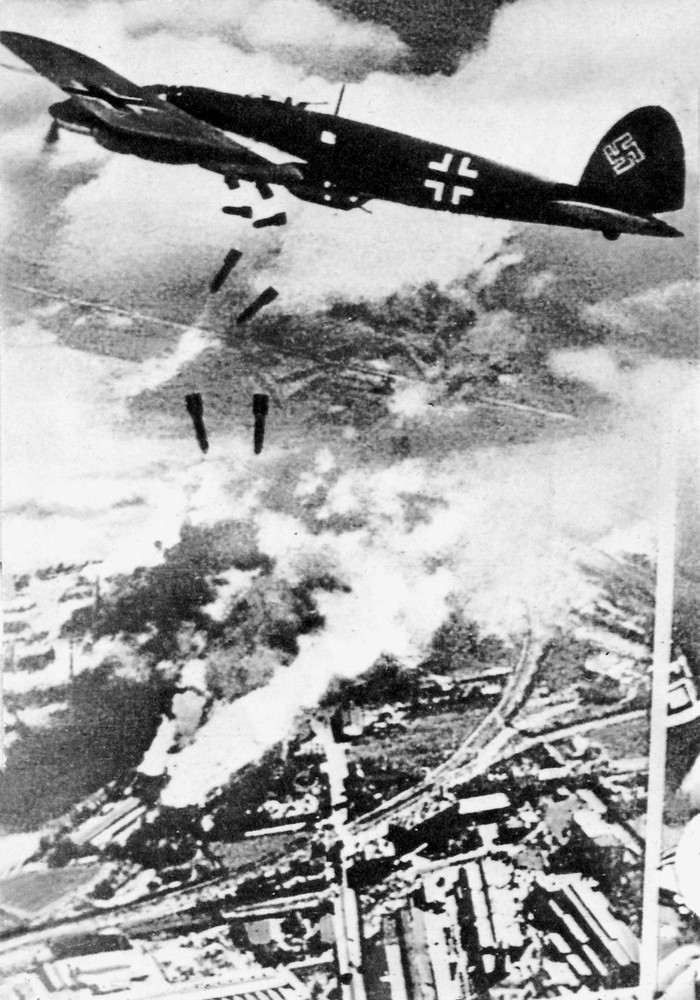
German Heinkel He 111 planes bombing Warsaw (September 1939)

The German and Italian bombings of Guernica and Durango in Spain in 1937 during the Spanish Civil War of 1936–1939 and the Japanese aerial attacks on crowded Chinese cities during the Second Sino-Japanese War in 1937–38 attracted worldwide condemnation, prompting the League of Nations to pass a resolution that called for the protection of civilian populations against bombardment from the air. In response to the resolution passed by the League of Nations, a draft convention in Amsterdam of 1938 would have provided specific definitions of what constituted an "undefended" town, excessive civilian casualties and appropriate warning. This draft convention makes the standard of being undefended quite high – any military units or anti-aircraft within the radius qualifies a town as defended. This convention, like the 1923 draft, was not ratified – nor even close to ratification – when hostilities broke out in Europe in 1939. While the two conventions offer a guideline to what the belligerent powers were considering before the war, neither of these documents came to be legally binding.

At the start of World War II in 1939, following an appeal by Franklin D. Roosevelt, President of the then neutral United States, the major European powers, including Britain and Germany, agreed not to bomb civilian targets outside combat zones: Britain agreeing provided that the other powers also refrained (see the policy on strategic bombing at the start of the World War II). However, this was not honored, as belligerents of both sides in the war adopted a policy of indiscriminate bombing of enemy cities. Throughout World War II, cities like Chongqing, Warsaw, Rotterdam, London, Coventry, Stalingrad, Hamburg, Dresden, Tokyo, Hiroshima, and Nagasaki suffered aerial bombardment, causing untold numbers of destroyed buildings and the deaths of tens of thousands of civilians.

After World War II, the massive destruction of non-combatant targets inflicted during the war prompted the victorious Allies to address the issue when developing the Nuremberg Charter of August 1945 to establish the procedures and laws for conducting the Nuremberg trials (1945–1946). Article 6(b) of the Charter thus condemned the "wanton destruction of cities, towns or villages, or devastation not justified by military necessity" and classified it as a violation of the laws or customs of war, therefore, making it a war crime. This provision was similarly used at the Tokyo Trials of 1946–1948 to try Japanese military and civilian leaders in accordance with the Tokyo Charter (January 1946) for illegal conducts committed during the Pacific War of 1941–1945. However, due to the absence of positive or specific customary international humanitarian law prohibiting illegal conducts of aerial warfare in World War II, the indiscriminate bombing of enemy cities was excluded from the category of war crimes at the Nuremberg and Tokyo Trials, therefore, no Axis officers and leaders were prosecuted for authorizing this practice. Furthermore, the United Nations War Crimes Commission received no notice of records of trial concerning the illegal conduct of air warfare. Chris Jochnick and Roger Normand in their article The Legitimation of Violence 1: A Critical History of the Laws of War explain that: "By leaving out morale bombing and other attacks on civilians unchallenged, the Tribunal conferred legal legitimacy on such practices."

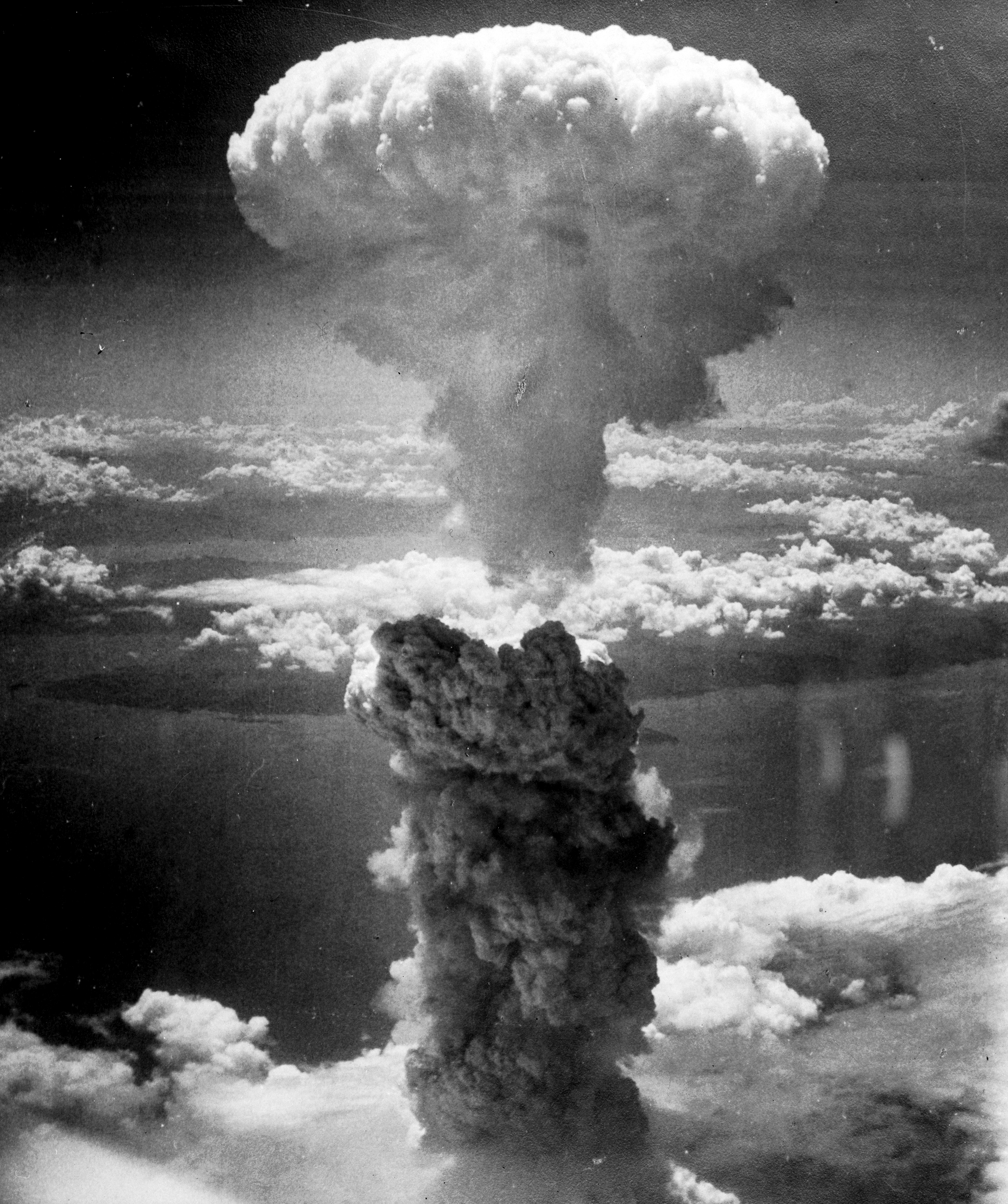
Mushroom cloud from the nuclear explosion over Nagasaki (9 August 1945)

In 1963 the atomic bombings of Hiroshima and Nagasaki became the subject of a Japanese judicial review in Ryuichi Shimoda et al. v. The State. In obiter dictum comments, the Court drew several distinctions which were pertinent to both conventional and atomic aerial bombardment. Relying on the Hague Convention of 1907 IV – The Laws and Customs of War on Land and IX – Bombardment by Naval Forces in Time of War, and the Hague Draft Rules of Air Warfare of 1922–1923, the Court drew a distinction between "Targeted Aerial Bombardment" and indiscriminate area bombardment (which the court called "Blind Aerial Bombardment"), and also a distinction between a defended and an undefended city. The court ruled that blind aerial bombardment was permitted only in the immediate vicinity of the operations of land forces and that only targeted aerial bombardment of military installations was permitted further from the front. It also ruled the incidental death of civilians and the destruction of civilian property during targeted aerial bombardment was not unlawful. The court acknowledged that the concept of a military objective was enlarged under conditions of total war, but stated that the distinction between the two did not disappear. The court also ruled that when military targets were concentrated in a comparatively small area, defense installations against air raids were very strong, and the destruction of non-military objectives was small in proportion to the large military interests, or necessity, such destruction was lawful. Thus, because of the immense power of the atom bombs, and the distance from enemy land forces, the atomic bombings of both Hiroshima and Nagasaki "was an illegal act of hostilities under international law as it existed at that time, as an indiscriminate bombardment of undefended cities".

Not all governments and scholars of international law agree with the analysis and conclusions of the Shimoda review, because it was not based on positive international humanitarian law. Colonel Javier Guisández Gómez, at the International Institute of Humanitarian Law in San Remo, points out:

In examining these events [anti-city strategy/blitz] in the light of international humanitarian law, it should be borne in mind that during the Second World War there was no agreement, treaty, convention or any other instrument governing the protection of the civilian population or civilian property, as the Conventions then in force dealt only with the protection of the wounded and the sick on the battlefield and in naval warfare, hospital ships, the laws and customs of war and the protection of prisoners of war.

John R. Bolton, Under Secretary of State for Arms Control and International Security Affairs (2001–2005) and U.S. Permanent Representative to the United Nations (2005–2006), explained in 2001 why the USA should not adhere to the Rome Statute of the International Criminal Court:

A fair reading of the [Rome Statute], for example, leaves the objective observer unable to answer with confidence whether the United States was guilty of war crimes for its aerial bombing campaigns over Germany and Japan in World War II. Indeed, if anything, a straightforward reading of the language probably indicates that the court would find the United States guilty. A fortiori, these provisions seem to imply that the United States would have been guilty of a war crime for dropping atomic bombs on Hiroshima and Nagasaki. This is intolerable and unacceptable.

== International law since 1945 ==
In the post war environment, a series of treaties governing the laws of war were adopted starting in 1949. These Geneva Conventions would come into force, in no small part, because of a general reaction against the practices of the Second World War. Although the Fourth Geneva Convention attempted to erect some legal defenses for civilians in time of war, the bulk of the Fourth Convention devoted to explicating civilian rights in occupied territories, and no explicit attention is paid to the problems of bombardment.

In 1977, Protocol I was adopted as an amendment to the Geneva Conventions, prohibiting the deliberate or indiscriminate attack of civilians and civilian objects, even if the area contained military objectives, and the attacking force must take precautions and steps to spare the lives of civilians and civilian objects as possible. However, forces occupying near densely populated areas must avoid locating military objectives near or in densely populated areas and endeavor to remove civilians from the vicinity of military objectives. Failure to do so would cause a higher civilian death toll resulting from bombardment by the attacking force and the defenders would be held responsible, even criminally liable, for these deaths. This issue was addressed because drafters of Protocol I pointed out historical examples such as Japan in World War II who often dispersed legitimate military and industrial targets (almost two-thirds of production was from small factories of thirty or fewer persons or in wooden homes, which were clustered around the factories) throughout urban areas in many of its cities either with the sole purpose of preventing enemy forces from bombing these targets or using its civilian casualties caused by enemy bombardment as propaganda value against the enemy. This move made Japan vulnerable to area bombardment and the U.S. Army Air Forces (USAAF) adopted a policy of carpetbombing which destroyed 69 Japanese cities with either incendiary bombs or atomic bombs, with the deaths of 381,000–500,000 Japanese people.

However, Protocol I also states that locating military objectives near civilians "shall not release the Parties to the conflict from their legal obligations with respect to the civilian population and civilians." (Article 51, Para 8)

The International Court of Justice gave an advisory opinion in July 1996 on the Legality of the Threat Or Use of Nuclear Weapons. The court ruled that "[t]here is in neither customary nor international law any comprehensive and universal prohibition of the threat or use of nuclear weapons." However, by a split vote, it also found that "[t]he threat or use of nuclear weapons would generally be contrary to the rules of international law applicable in armed conflict." The Court stated that it could not definitively conclude whether the threat or use of nuclear weapons would be lawful or unlawful in an extreme circumstance of self-defense, in which the very survival of the state would be at stake.

== See also ==
- Aerial bombing of cities
- Area bombardment
- Carpet bombing
- Civilian casualties of strategic bombing
- Roerich Pact
- Strategic bombing
- Tactical bombing
- Terror bombing
