= Medium bomber =

Aircraft class designed to attack ground targets

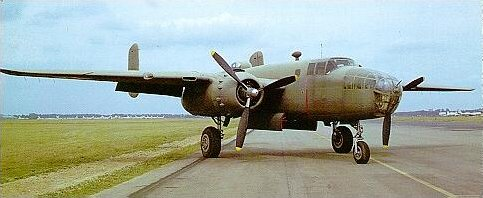
The USAAF B-25B Mitchell, a medium bomber.

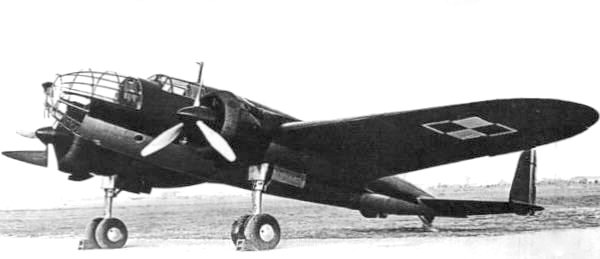
Polish PZL.37 Łoś, a medium bomber.

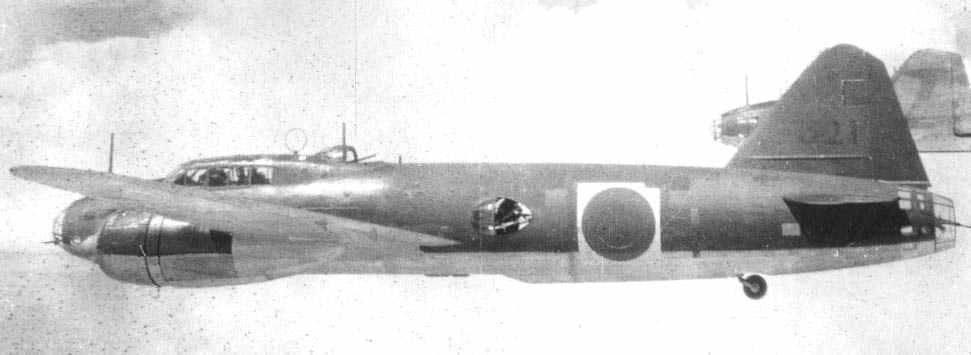
The Japanese Mitsubishi G4M "Betty", a medium bomber.

A medium bomber is a military bomber aircraft designed to operate with medium-sized bombloads over medium range distances; the name serves to distinguish this type from larger heavy bombers and smaller light bombers. Mediums generally carried about two tons of bombs, compared to light bombers that carried one ton, and heavies that carried four or more.

The term was used prior to and during World War II, based on available parameters of engine and aeronautical technology for bomber aircraft designs at that time. After the war, medium bombers were replaced in world air forces by more advanced and capable aircraft.

== History ==
In the early 1930s many air forces were looking to modernize their existing bomber aircraft fleets, which frequently consisted of older biplanes. The new designs were typically twin-engined monoplanes, often of all-metal construction, and optimized for high enough performance and speed to help evade rapidly evolving fighter aircraft designs of the time. Some of these bombers, such as the Heinkel He 111, Junkers Ju 86, Savoia-Marchetti SM.79, Douglas B-18, and Armstrong Whitworth Whitley were developed from or in conjunction with existing airliners or transport aircraft.

The World War II-era medium bomber was generally considered to be any level bomber design that delivered about 4,000 pounds (1,800 kg) of ordnance over ranges of about 1,500 to 2,000 mi (2,400 to 3,200 km). Typical heavy bombers were those with a nominal load of 8,000 pounds (3,600 kg) or more, and light bombers carried up to 2,000 lb (907 kg).

These distinctions were beginning to disappear by the middle of World War II, when a powerful fighter aircraft could carry a 2,000 lb (907 kg) bombload. Advances in powerplants and designs eventually allowed light bombers, tactical bombers, and later jet fighter-bombers to take over the roles performed by mediums.

After the war, use of the term generally vanished; some of this was due to mass demobilization of the participant air forces' existing equipment, and the fact that several of the most-produced medium bomber types were then technologically obsolescent. Although a number of later aircraft were designed in this performance and load-carrying range, they were henceforth referred to as tactical bombers or strike aircraft instead. Examples of post-war mediums include the English Electric Canberra (along with its derived U.S. counterpart, the Martin B-57) and the Soviet Ilyushin Il-28 "Beagle".

Subsequent to World War II, only the U.S. Strategic Air Command ever used the term "medium bomber" in the 1950s to distinguish its Boeing B-47 Stratojets from somewhat larger contemporary Boeing B-52 Stratofortress "heavy bombers" in bombardment wings (older B-29 and B-50 heavy bombers were also redesignated as "medium" during this period). This nomenclature was purely semantic and bureaucratic, however as both the B-47 and B-52 strategic bombers were much larger and had far greater performance and load-carrying ability than any of the World War II-era heavy or medium bombers. Similarly, the Royal Air Force referred at times to its V bomber force as medium bombers, but this was in terms of range rather than load-carrying capacity.

Although the term is no longer used, development of aircraft that fulfil a 'medium bomber' mission in all but name continued and these have been employed in various post-World War II conflicts; examples include dedicated tactical bombers such as the Su-24, Su-34, F-111, J-16 and F-15E which have greater payload and range capability than fighter-bombers, but less than heavier strategic bombers.

== Medium bombers ==
Introduced prior to World War II (September 1, 1939)

- Armstrong Whitworth Whitley — first of three British medium bombers
- Bloch MB.210
- CANT Z.1007
- Douglas B-18 Bolo — developed from the DC-2 airliner design
- Douglas B-23 Dragon
- Dornier Do 23
- Fiat BR.20 Cicogna — first all-metal Italian bomber
- Fokker T.V — Dutch army air force (Luchtvaartafdeling) bomber
- Handley Page Hampden — British medium bomber, almost as fast as the Bristol Blenheim
- Heinkel He 111 — considered a heavy bomber by the Luftwaffe for some missions
- Ilyushin DB-3 — precursor to the Il-4 (see below)
- Junkers Ju 52 (briefly during the Spanish Civil War)
- Junkers Ju 86
- Lioré et Olivier LeO 45 — fast French medium bomber
- Martin B-10 — American bomber which was highly advanced at the time of its 1934 service introduction
- Mitsubishi G3M — known to the Allies as "Nell"
- Mitsubishi Ki-21 — "Sally"; replaced some Fiat BR.20 bombers in the Imperial Japanese Army Air Service
- PZL.37 Łoś - the most advanced Polish aircraft at the time of the invasion of Poland
- Savoia-Marchetti SM.79 — three-engined Italian medium bomber used successfully as a torpedo bomber early in World War II
- Vickers Wellington — most-produced British medium bomber, with a unique aluminum lattice airframe designed by Barnes Wallis and capable of 2,500 miles range

World War II

- de Havilland Mosquito — considered a multi-role aircraft
- Dornier Do 217 — considered a heavy bomber by the Luftwaffe for some missions
- Ilyushin Il-4 — long ranged Soviet bomber
- Junkers Ju 88 — versatile aircraft used in many different roles, including torpedo bomber, dive bomber, night fighter and reconnaissance
- Martin B-26 Marauder — had lowest mission loss rate of any USAAF bomber in World War II
- Mitsubishi G4M — known to the Allies as "Betty"
- Mitsubishi Ki-67 Hiryū — Allied reporting name "Peggy"; classified as heavy by the Imperial Japanese Army Air Service
- Nakajima Ki-49 Donryu — "Helen"
- North American B-25 Mitchell — most-produced American medium bomber
- Savoia-Marchetti SM.84 — less successful replacement for the SM.79, which instead remained in service even after this aircraft
- Tupolev Tu-2 — used in multiple roles similar to the German Junkers Ju 88
- Yermolayev Yer-2 - developed from the failed Bartini Stal-7; used both as long-range bomber and as heavy ground attacker, with the latter role resulting in heavy losses.
- Yokosuka P1Y Ginga — a medium bomber to the Imperial Japanese Navy Air Service; but in size, weight, speed etc. similar to Allied light bombers such as the Douglas A-26 Invader

Post World War II

- English Electric Canberra - British jet bomber introduced in the 1950s
- Ilyushin Il-28 — Soviet jet bomber
- Martin B-57 Canberra — U.S. licence-built development of English Electric Canberra
- Douglas A-3 Skywarrior — U.S. naval jet strike aircraft; a derivative was adopted by United States Air Force Tactical Air Command designated as the B-66 "tactical light bomber"
- North American AJ Savage — U.S. naval medium bomber powered by two piston engines and a turbojet buried in the rear fuselage.
- North American A-5 Vigilante — U.S. naval supersonic jet strike aircraft
- Dassault Mirage IV — French supersonic jet strategic bomber
- Grumman A-6 Intruder — U.S. naval strike aircraft; approximate in size to a World War II medium with range and payload comparable to a World War II heavy bomber
- Blackburn Buccaneer — Royal Navy carrier-based maritime strike aircraft
- General Dynamics F-111 — U.S. supersonic swing wing strike aircraft
- Sukhoi Su-24 — Soviet supersonic swing wing strike aircraft similar in role and configuration to the F-111

== See also ==
- Dive bomber
- Fighter-bomber
- High level bombing
- Maritime patrol aircraft
- Strategic bomber
- Tactical bombing
- Torpedo bomber
