= Ryuichi Shimoda v. The State =

Japanese court case (decided 1963)

Ryuichi Shimoda, et al. v. The State
- Court: Tokyo District Court
- Full case name: Ryuichi Shimoda, et al v. The State 下田(隆一)事件
- Decided: Argued April 1955–October 1963, Decided December 7, 1963
- Citations: Japanese Annual of International Law, No. 8 (1964), p. 212
- Legislation cited: Hague Convention of 1907 IV - The Laws and Customs of War on Land, IX - Bombardment by Naval Forces in Time of War, and the Hague Draft Rules of Air Warfare of 1922–1923

Court membership
- Judges sitting: Toshimasa Koseki (presiding); Yoshiko Mibuchi; Akira Takakuwa

Case opinions
- The aerial bombardment with atomic bombs of the cities of Hiroshima and Nagasaki was an illegal act of hostilities according to the rules of international law. Nevertheless, the claimant as an individual was not entitled to claim damages on the plane of international law, and he was not able, as a result of the doctrine of sovereign immunity, to pursue a claim on the plane of municipal law. In these circumstances, the plaintiffs had no rights to lose as a result of the waiver contained in Article 19 (a) of the Treaty of San Francisco.

Ryuichi Shimoda et al. v. The State was an unsuccessful case brought before the District Court of Tokyo by a group of five survivors of the atomic attacks on Hiroshima and Nagasaki, who claimed the action was illegal under the laws of war and demanded reparations from the Japanese government on the ground that it waived the right for reparations from the U.S. government under the 1951 Treaty of San Francisco.

== Background ==
Ever since the atomic bombings of Hiroshima and Nagasaki in World War II, there has been legal debate over the action. On August 10, 1945, the Japanese government addressed a communication to the International Committee of the Red Cross, asking it to denounce the U.S. government as performing a crime under international law. Following the surrender of Japan and the landing of U.S. occupation troops in the country, Prime Minister Naruhiko Higashikuni offered not to make any complaints in the media or in legal institutions about the use of the nuclear weapons if the United States Government agreed to drop its demand to try Japanese war criminals. During the Tokyo War Crimes Trial, some of the defense lawyers tried to convince the International Military Tribunal of the Far East to launch a legal investigation into the matter of the legality of the first use of nuclear weapons, but their motions were ignored. At the end, the Tokyo trials did not raise any issues regarding the strategic bombing of cities during World War II both because the Allies performed the same air raid conducts as the Axis powers and that no international treaty governing aerial warfare existed throughout the war. As a result, many Japanese leaders and military personnel escaped prosecution for the bombings of Asian cities and unprovoked attack on the neutral United States at Pearl Harbor.

Despite this, one of these defense lawyers, Shoichi Okamoto, decided to press on with the nuclear weapons issue after the trial was concluded. In February 1953, he published a booklet titled "Genbaku Minso Wakumon (Questions and Answers on the Civil Lawsuit over the Atomic Bombings)", in which he called upon individuals in Hiroshima and Nagasaki to take legal action against the U.S. government within the U.S. legal system.

Okamoto's plan met great opposition within Japanese society and even in Hiroshima and Nagasaki. Shinzo Hamai, the mayor of Hiroshima at the time, opposed the plan on grounds that the US legal system was not favorable to such actions, based largely upon Article 19 (a) of the 1951 Treaty of San Francisco, which prevents Japanese nationals from suing the U.S. for actions "arising out of the war or out of actions taken because of the existence of a state of war" (similarly, U.S. nationals are not permitted under Article 14 (b) of the treaty to sue Japan for its war-related acts). As a result, Okamoto gave up the notion of trying the case in a US court and decided to seek action in the Japanese legal system. In co-operation with local organizations in Hiroshima and Nagasaki, a group of five people were selected for the purpose of making the motion in a Japanese court. Shimoda, the leader of the group, came from Hiroshima and was 57 years old. He lost four daughters and one son in the atomic attack on Hiroshima, and he, his wife and surviving son suffered from persistent health problems. A lawyer named Yasuhiro Matsui joined the legal team.

Proceedings at the District Court in Tokyo began in April 1955, and they lasted for eight and a half years until the final ruling was rendered on December 8, 1963. Okamoto died of a stroke in April 1958 and did not live to see the final ruling.

== The ruling ==
On 7 December 1963, in Ryuichi Shimoda et al. v. The State the atomic bombings of Hiroshima and Nagasaki were the subject of a Japanese judicial review. On the 22nd anniversary of the attack on Pearl Harbor, the District Court of Tokyo ruled the use of nuclear weapons in warfare wasn't illegal, but issued an opinion in its obiter dictum that the act of dropping an atomic bomb on cities was at the time governed by the Hague Convention of 1907 IV - The Laws and Customs of War on Land (governing land warfare) and IX - Bombardment by Naval Forces in Time of War (governing bombardment of land targets by naval ships), and the Hague Draft Rules of Air Warfare of 1922–1923 (which detailed regulations for aerial warfare, but never came into force), and was therefore illegal.

It was reported in the Hanrei Jiho (Law Cases Report), vol. 355, p. 17; translated in The Japanese Annual of International Law, vol. 8, 1964, p. 231. that the facts were that

The plaintiffs, Japanese nationals, were all residents either of Hiroshima or of Nagasaki when atomic bombs were dropped on these cities by bombers of the United States [Army] Air Force[s] in August 1945. Most of the members of their families were killed and many, including some of the plaintiffs themselves, were seriously wounded as a result of these bombings. The plaintiffs jointly brought the present action against the defendant, the State, for damages on the following grounds: (a) that they suffered injury through the dropping of atomic bombs by members of the [Army] Air Force[s] of the United States of America; (b) that the dropping of atomic bombs as an act of hostilities was illegal under the rules of positive international law (taking both treaty law and customary law into consideration) then in force, for which the plaintiffs had a claim for damages; (c) that the dropping of atomic bombs also constituted a wrongful act on the plane of municipal law, ascribable to the United States and its President, Mr. Harry S. Truman; (d) that Japan had waived, by virtue of the provisions of Article 19 (a) of the Treaty of Peace with Japan of 1951, the claims of the plaintiffs under international law and municipal law, with the result that the plaintiffs had lost their claims for damages against the United States and its President; and (e) that this waiver of the plaintiffs' claims by the defendant, the State, gave rise to an obligation on the part of the defendant to pay damages to the plaintiffs.

The plaintiffs' cause of action was based, more specifically, on the provisions of Article I of the State Redress Law, which was applicable to the case of injury to a private person through an unlawful act of a government official; on the provisions of Article 29 of the [Japanese] Constitution, which provided for the obligation to pay just compensation in every case of expropriation of private property by the State for public use; and, finally, on unlawful infringement of the rights of the plaintiffs through the omission of the defendant to take appropriate measures for recovery of compensation.

And it was held

that the action must fail on the merits. The aerial bombardment with atomic bombs of the cities of Hiroshima and Nagasaki was an illegal act of hostilities according to the rules of international law. It must be regarded as indiscriminate aerial bombardment of undefended cities, even if it were directed at military objectives only, inasmuch as it resulted in damage comparable to that caused by indiscriminate bombardment. Nevertheless, the claimant as an individual was not entitled to claim damages on the plane of international law, nor was he able, as a result of the doctrine of sovereign immunity, to pursue a claim on the plane of municipal law. In these circumstances, the plaintiffs had no rights to lose as a result of the waiver contained in Article 19 (a) of the Treaty of Peace with Japan.

== Aerial bombardment ==
Although no international treaty governing air warfare existed at the time of the bombings, the court issued its obiter dictum judgment based on several distinctions which were pertinent to both conventional and atomic aerial bombardment. Relying on the Hague Convention of 1907 IV - The Laws and Customs of War on Land and IX - Bombardment by Naval Forces in Time of War, and the Hague Draft Rules of Air Warfare of 1922–1923, the court drew a distinction between "Targeted Aerial Bombardment" and indiscriminate area bombardment, that the court called "Blind Aerial Bombardment" and a distinction between a defended and an undefended city. "In principle, a defended city is a city which resists an attempt at occupation by land forces. A city even with defence installations and armed forces cannot be said to be a defended city if it is far away from the battlefield and is not in immediate danger of occupation by the enemy."

The court ruled that blind aerial bombardment was permitted only in the immediate vicinity of the operations of land forces and that only targeted aerial bombardment of military installations was permitted further from the front. It also ruled that the incidental death of civilians and the destruction of civilian property during targeted aerial bombardment was not unlawful. The court acknowledged that the concept of a military objective was enlarged under conditions of total war, but stated that the distinction between the two did not disappear.

The court also ruled that when military targets were concentrated in a comparatively small area, and where defense installations against air raids were very strong, that when the destruction of non-military objectives was small in proportion to the large military interests, or necessity, such destruction was lawful. Thus, because of the immense power of the atom bombs and the distance from enemy land forces, the atomic bombings of both Hiroshima and Nagasaki "was an illegal act of hostilities under international law as it existed at that time, as an indiscriminate bombardment of undefended cities".

== Aftermath ==
One of the main arguments of the court in the Shimoda case, that the waiver of claims in the San Francisco peace treaty precluded any actions for damages by Japanese citizens against the US government, was also used in the US legal system. In the case of Mitsubishi Materials Corporation et al. v. Frank H. Dillman et al., dealing with a lawsuit by a former US prisoner of war against Mitsubishi for its part in the forced labor that he performed during the Second World War, the Superior Court of Orange County rejected the motion and referred to the Shimoda case as follows:

[The Japanese court] found against the plaintiffs because even though the Shimoda court was willing to say that the United States had in fact violated international law, it also said that Japan had waived the right of its nationals to recover against the United States because of the 1951 treaty....

Without a waiver of all war crime claims that could have been brought by either side, Japan and the United States might have wrangled endlessly about liabilities arising out of the war.
