= Civilian casualties of strategic bombing =

War casualties

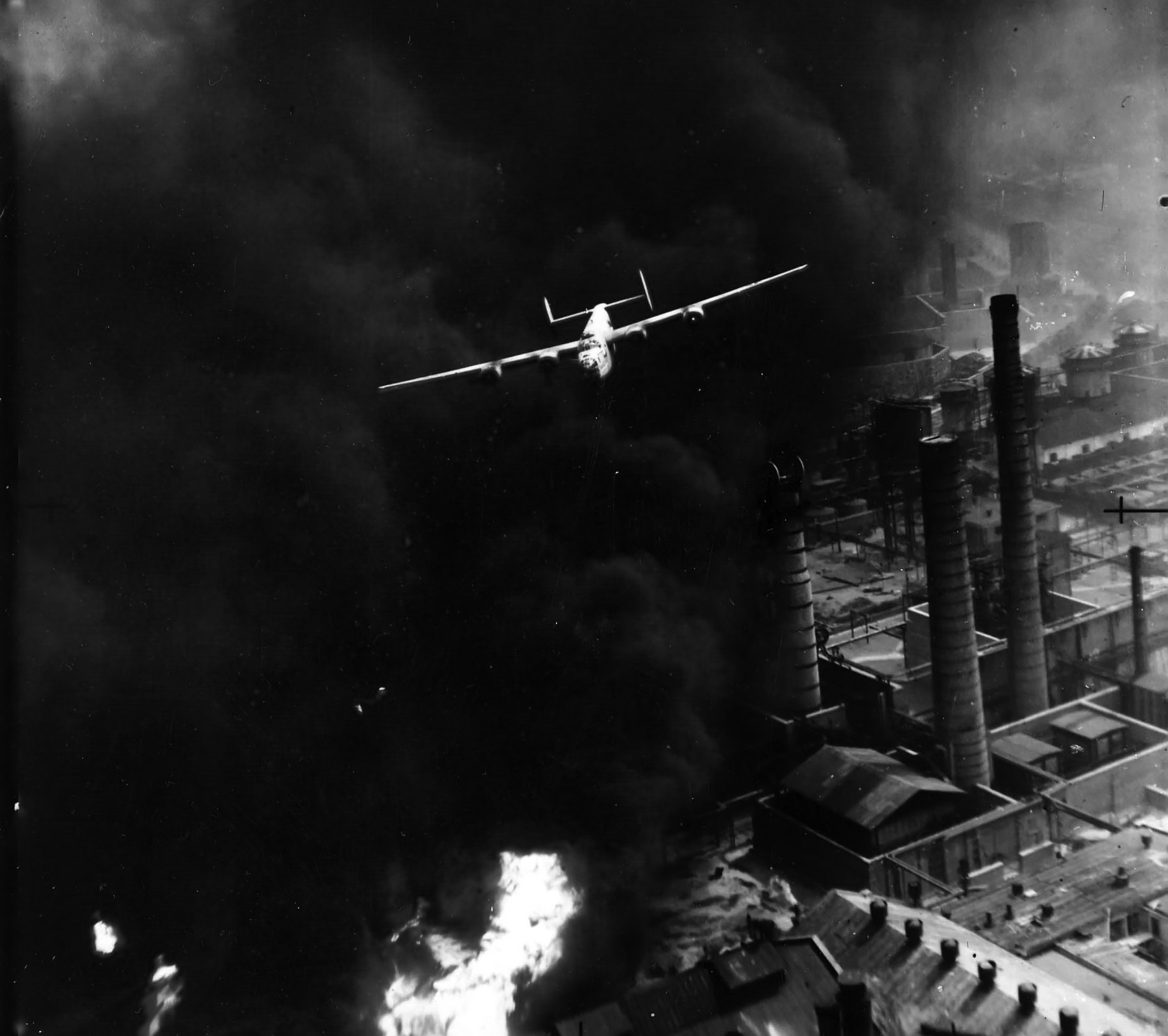
B-24 "Sandman" on a bomb run over the Astra Romana refinery in Ploieşti, Romania, during Operation Tidal Wave.

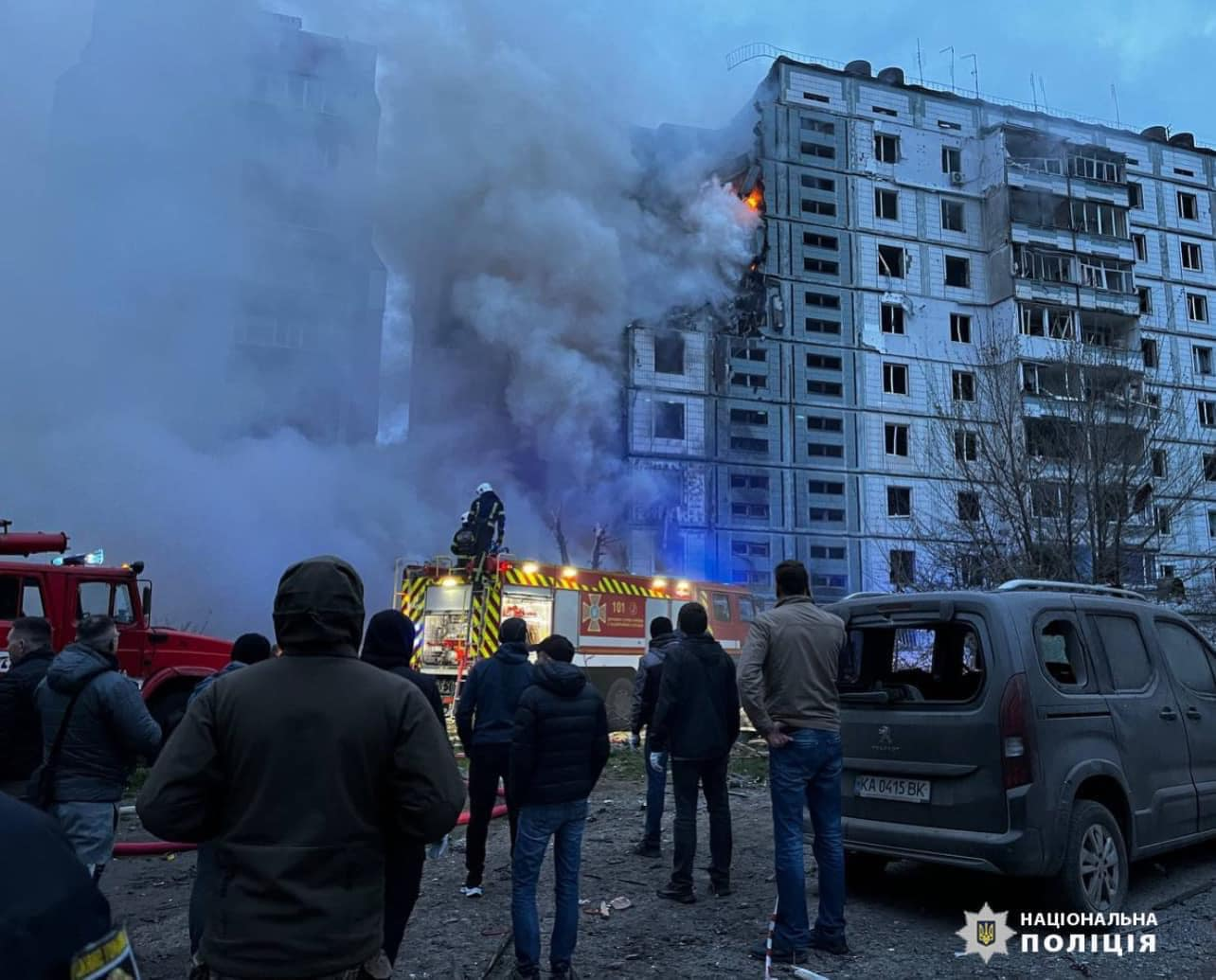
Residential building in Uman (Cherkasy Oblast of Ukraine) after Russian missile strike on 28 April 2023.

Strategic bombing is the use of airpower to destroy industrial and economic infrastructure—such as factories, oil refineries, railroads, or power stations—rather than just directly targeting military bases, supply depots, or enemy combatants. Strategic bombing may also include the intent to dehouse, demoralize, or inflict civilian casualties, and thus hinders them from supporting the enemy's war effort. The bombing can be utilized by strategic bombers or missiles, and may use general-purpose bombs, guided bombs, incendiary devices, chemical weapons, biological weapons, or nuclear weapons.

This article is currently not comprehensive, but lists strategic bombing of cities and towns, and human death tolls starting from before World War II.

== Spanish Civil War (July 18, 1936 – April 1, 1939) ==
City/Town	Country	Date	Estimated death toll	Attacking force	Notes
Madrid	Spain	28 August 1936 March 1937	1,490	German Luftwaffe "Condor Legion" and the Italian Fascist Aviazione Legionaria	First modern bombing in history.
Albacete	Spain	19-20 February 1937	130-150	German Luftwaffe "Condor Legion"	
Jaén	Spain	1 April 1937	159	German Luftwaffe "Condor Legion"	See: Bombing of Jaén.
Guernica	Spain	26 April 1937	153	German Luftwaffe "Condor Legion" and the Italian Fascist Aviazione Legionaria	Considered to be the first aerial attack that caused widespread destruction of a city in military aviation history. See: Bombing of Guernica.
Barcelona	Spain	16–19 March 1938	1,000–1,300	Italian Fascist Aviazione Legionaria	See: Bombing of Barcelona.
Alicante	Spain	25 May 1938	275–393	Italian Fascist Aviazione Legionaria	See: Bombing of Alicante.
Granollers	Spain	31 May 1938	100–224	Italian Fascist Aviazione Legionaria	See: Bombing of Granollers.
La Garriga	Spain	28–29 January 1939	13	Italian Fascist Aviazione Legionaria	See: Bombing of La Garriga.

== Second Sino-Japanese War (July 7, 1937 – September 1, 1939, merged into World War II on September 1, 1939) ==
City/Town	Country	Date	Estimated death toll	Attacking force	Notes
Nanking	China	25 September 1937	600	Imperial Japanese Army Air Service	See: Bombing of Nanking.
Guangzhou	China	28 May and 4 June 1938	1,400–1,450	Imperial Japanese Navy Air Service	Japanese naval bombers attacked Guangzhou, killing 700–750 civilians and wounding 1,350 on 28 May 1938. Seven days later, the city was attacked again, causing an estimated 2,000 casualties (700 deaths). Combined the dates, an estimated 1,400–1,450 Chinese civilians were killed.

== World War II (September 1, 1939 – September 2, 1945) ==
City/Town	Country	Date	Estimated death toll	Attacking force	Notes
Wieluń	Poland	1 September 1939	c. 1,300	Oberkommando der Luftwaffe	See: Bombing of Wieluń.
Warsaw	Poland	1–27 September 1939	6,000–7,000	Oberkommando der Luftwaffe	See: Bombing of Warsaw in World War II.
Rotterdam	Netherlands	14 May 1940	884	Oberkommando der Luftwaffe	Firestorm. See: Rotterdam Blitz.
Berlin	Germany	June 1940 - April 1945	50,000	Royal Air Force (RAF) Bomber Command, United States Army Air Forces (USAAF) Eighth Air Force, French Air Force.	Various. See Bombing of Berlin in World War II
Milan	Italy	June 1940 – April 1945	2,200	RAF Bomber Command, USAAF	See: Bombing of Milan in World War II.
Turin	Italy	June 1940 – April 1945	2,069–2,199	RAF Bomber Command, USAAF	See: Bombing of Turin in World War II.
Palermo	Italy	June 1940 – August 1943	2,123	RAF, USAAF	See: Bombing of Palermo in World War II.
London	United Kingdom	7 September 1940 – May 1941	40,000-43,000	Oberkommando der Luftwaffe	Firestorm. See: London Blitz.
Chushien	China	4 October 1940	21	Imperial Japanese Army Air Service	21 civilians were killed when a Japanese airplane flew over the town of Chushien and released rice and wheat plus rat fleas carrying Y. pestis.
Ningbo	China	29 October 1940	99	Imperial Japanese Army Air Service	99 civilians were killed when Imperial Japanese Army Air Service bombers struck the city of Ningbo with ceramic bombs full of fleas carrying the bubonic plague.
Sukabumi	Indonesia	6 March 1942	70	Imperial Japanese Navy Air Service	See: Bombing of Sukabumi
Naples	Italy	November 1940 – February 1944	6,000–7,000	RAF, USAAF, Luftwaffe	
Liverpool	United Kingdom	December 1940 to May 1941	4000	Oberkommando der Luftwaffe	See: Liverpool Blitz
Birmingham	United Kingdom	19 November 1940	450	Oberkommando der Luftwaffe	Firestorm. See: Birmingham Blitz.
Bristol	United Kingdom	24 November 1940	207	Oberkommando der Luftwaffe	Firestorm. See: Bristol Blitz.
Belgrade	Kingdom of Yugoslavia	6–8 April 1941	1,500–4,000	Oberkommando der Luftwaffe	See: Operation Retribution (1941).
Chongqing	China	5 June 1941	4,000	Imperial Japanese Army Air Service and the Imperial Japanese Navy Air Service	Conflagration. Within three hours of bombing, 4,000 residents were asphyxiated to death. See: Bombing of Chongqing.
Leningrad	Soviet Union	19 September 1941	1,000	Oberkommando der Luftwaffe	See: Siege of Leningrad.
Rangoon	Burma	23 and 25 December 1941	1,250–2,000	Imperial Japanese Army Air Service	Lack of adequate protection of the city caused extensive damage to houses and mass civilian casualties. See: Bombing of Rangoon (1941–1942).
Paris	France	2–3 March 1942	600	Royal Air Force (RAF) Bomber Command	See: Bombing of France during World War II.
Cologne	Germany	30–31 May 1942	411	Royal Air Force (RAF) Bomber Command	Firestorm. See: Bombing of Cologne in World War II.
Stalingrad	Soviet Union	23 August 1942	955	Oberkommando der Luftwaffe	Firestorm. See: Bombing of Stalingrad in World War II.
Mortsel	Belgium	5 April 1943	936	United States Army Air Forces (USAAF) Eighth Air Force	
Hamburg	Germany	24–30 July 1943	42,600	Royal Air Force (RAF) Bomber Command and the United States Army Air Forces (USAAF) Eighth Air Force	Firestorm. See: Battle of Hamburg.
Bologna	Italy	July 1943 – April 1945	2,481	RAF Bomber Command, USAAF	See: Bombing of Bologna in World War II.
Kassel	Germany	22–23 October 1943	10,000	Royal Air Force (RAF) Bomber Command	Firestorm. See: Bombing of Kassel in World War II.
Augsburg	Germany	25–26 February 1944	730	Royal Air Force (RAF) Bomber Command and the United States Army Air Forces (USAAF) Eighth Air Force	Firestorm. See: Bombing of Augsburg in World War II.
Caen	France	7 July 1944	400	Royal Air Force (RAF) Bomber Command	Carried out in support of Operation Charnwood, the attempt by ground forces to capture Caen. The bombing failed, as the main German armor and infantry positions to the north of Caen remained intact. In order to avoid dropping bombs on their own ground forces, the markers were dropped too far forward, pushing the bombed zone well into Caen itself and further away from the German defenses, and thus inflicting heavy French civilian casualties.
Darmstadt	Germany	11–12 September 1944	11,500	Royal Air Force (RAF) Bomber Command	Firestorm. See: Bombing of Darmstadt in World War II.
Duisburg	Germany	14–15 October 1944	2,500	Royal Air Force (RAF) Bomber Command	Firestorm. See: Bombing of Duisburg in World War II.
Ulm	Germany	17 December 1944	707	Royal Air Force (RAF) Bomber Command	Firestorm. See: Bombing of Ulm in World War II.
Dresden	Germany	13–15 February 1945	25,000	Royal Air Force (RAF) Bomber Command and the United States Army Air Forces (USAAF) Eighth Air Force	Firestorm. See: Bombing of Dresden in World War II.
Pforzheim	Germany	23 February 1945	17,600	Royal Air Force (RAF) Bomber Command	Firestorm. See: Bombing of Pforzheim in World War II.
The Hague	Netherlands	3 March 1945	551	Royal Air Force (RAF) Bomber Command	The high rate of civilian casualties resulted due to the wrong coordinates given to RAF pilots, which dropped the bombs on the densely populated neighborhood of Bezuidenhout instead of Haagse Bos, where the Germans had installed V-2 launching facilities that had been used to attack English cities. See: Bombing of the Bezuidenhout.
Tokyo	Japan	9–10 March 1945	120,000-200,000	United States Army Air Forces (USAAF) Twentieth Air Force	Conflagration. 279 B-29s dropped about 1,700 short tons (1,500 t) of bombs, destroying 16 square miles (41 km^{2}) of the city. See: Bombing of Tokyo
Osaka	Japan	13–14 March 1945	3,987	United States Army Air Forces (USAAF) Twentieth Air Force	Firestorm. See: Bombing of Osaka.
Würzburg	Germany	16 March 1945	5,000	Royal Air Force (RAF) Bomber Command	Firestorm. See: Bombing of Würzburg in World War II.
Kobe	Japan	16–17 March 1945	8,841	United States Army Air Forces (USAAF) Twentieth Air Force	Firestorm. See: Bombing of Kobe in World War II.
Taipei	Taiwan	31 May 1945	3,000	United States Army Air Forces (USAAF) Fifth Air Force	See: Raid on Taipei.
Aomori	Japan	29 July 1945	1,767	United States Army Air Forces (USAAF) Twentieth Air Force	Firestorm. See: Bombing of Aomori in World War II
Hiroshima	Japan	6 August 1945	70,000 – 126,000	United States Army Air Forces (USAAF) 393rd Bomb Squadron	The first of the only two nuclear weapons used in combat. Uranium-based nuclear weapon: codename Little Boy. Between 50,000 and 60,000 were killed, including 20,000 Korean slave laborers. Some 70,000 others suffered burns or died by the end of 1945 and in the years afterwards. See: Atomic bombings of Hiroshima and Nagasaki.
Nagasaki	Japan	9 August 1945	39,000–80,000	United States Army Air Forces (USAAF) 393rd Bomb Squadron	The second of the only two nuclear weapons used in combat. Plutonium-based nuclear weapon: codename Fat Man. Between 34,850 and 39,850 were killed, including 23,200 to 28,200 Japanese industrial workers and 2,000 Korean slave laborers. Some 50,000 others suffered burns or died by the end of 1945 and in the years afterwards. See: Atomic bombings of Hiroshima and Nagasaki.

== 1991 Gulf War (August 2, 1990 – February 28, 1991) ==
City/town	Country	Date	Estimated death toll	Attacking force	Notes
Baghdad	Iraq	13 February 1991	408	United States Air Force (USAF)	See: Amiriyah shelter bombing
Fallujah	Iraq	14 February 1991	50–150	Royal Air Force (RAF)	A Royal Air Force (RAF) fighter jet fired two laser-guided missiles which were aimed at a bridge which was used as part of an Iraqi military supply line on 14 February 1991. The missiles malfunctioned and struck Fallujah's largest marketplace (which was situated in a residential area), killing between 50 and 150 non-combatants and wounding many more. After news of the mistake became public, an RAF spokesman, Group Captain David Henderson issued a statement noting that the missile had malfunctioned but admitted that the Royal Air Force had made an error. Coalition warplanes subsequently launched another attack on the bridge, with one missile hitting its target while two others fell into the river and a fourth struck another marketplace in Fallujah, due to its laser guidance system once again malfunctioning.

== NATO bombing of Yugoslavia (1999) ==
Location	Date	Death toll	Attacking force	Notes
Varadin Bridge in Novi Sad, Serbia	1 April 1999	1	NATO	
Nogovac, Orahovac, Kosovo	2 April 1999	11	NATO	
Oil refinery in Pančevo, Serbia	4 April 1999	3	NATO	Three workers killed by NATO airstrikes. Subsequently, 80,000 tons of oil ignited into flames, and the concentration of carcinogens over Pančevo rose 10,500 times higher than local laws allowed at the time.
Electric heating plant in Belgrade, Serbia	4 April 1999	1	NATO	One civilian killed by NATO airstrikes.
Vranje, Serbia	5 April 1999	2	NATO	Two civilians killed and 15 injured by NATO airstrikes on a city neighbourhood.
Town of Aleksinac, Serbia	5–6 April 1999	12	NATO	On the night of April 5–6, 1999, 12 civilians killed in the mining town of Aleksinac by NATO airstrikes. A total of 35 homes and 125 apartment units were destroyed, with no obvious military target in the vicinity according to the Serbian newspaper Politika.
Train in Leskovac, Serbia	12 April 1999	20–60	NATO	See Grdelica train bombing.
Albanian refugee column in Gjakova, Kosovo	14 April 1999	73	NATO	See NATO bombing of Albanian refugees near Gjakova.
Serbian refugee camp at Gjakova	21 April 1999	4–5	NATO	
Radio Television of Serbia headquarters, Belgrade	24 April 1999	16	NATO	See NATO bombing of the Radio Television of Serbia headquarters.
Town of Surdulica, Serbia	27 April 1999	16–20	NATO	
Lužane bridge near Podujevo, Kosovo	1 May 1999	23–60	NATO	See Lužane bus bombing.
Town of Prizren, Kosovo	1 May 1999	12	NATO	12 civilians killed.

== Second Chechen War (1999–2009) ==
City/Town	Country	Date	Estimated death toll	Attacking force	Notes
Elistanzhi	Chechnya, Russia	October 7, 1999	34	Russian Air Force	See: Elistanzhi cluster bomb attack
Grozny	Chechnya, Russia	October 21, 1999	118	Russia's Strategic Missile Troops	The use of Scud ballistic missiles against various civilian and government/military targets. See also: Grozny ballistic missile attack.

== See also ==
- Aerial bombardment and international law
- Aerial bombing of cities
- Casualty recording
- Roerich Pact
