= Area bombardment =

Military aviation tactic

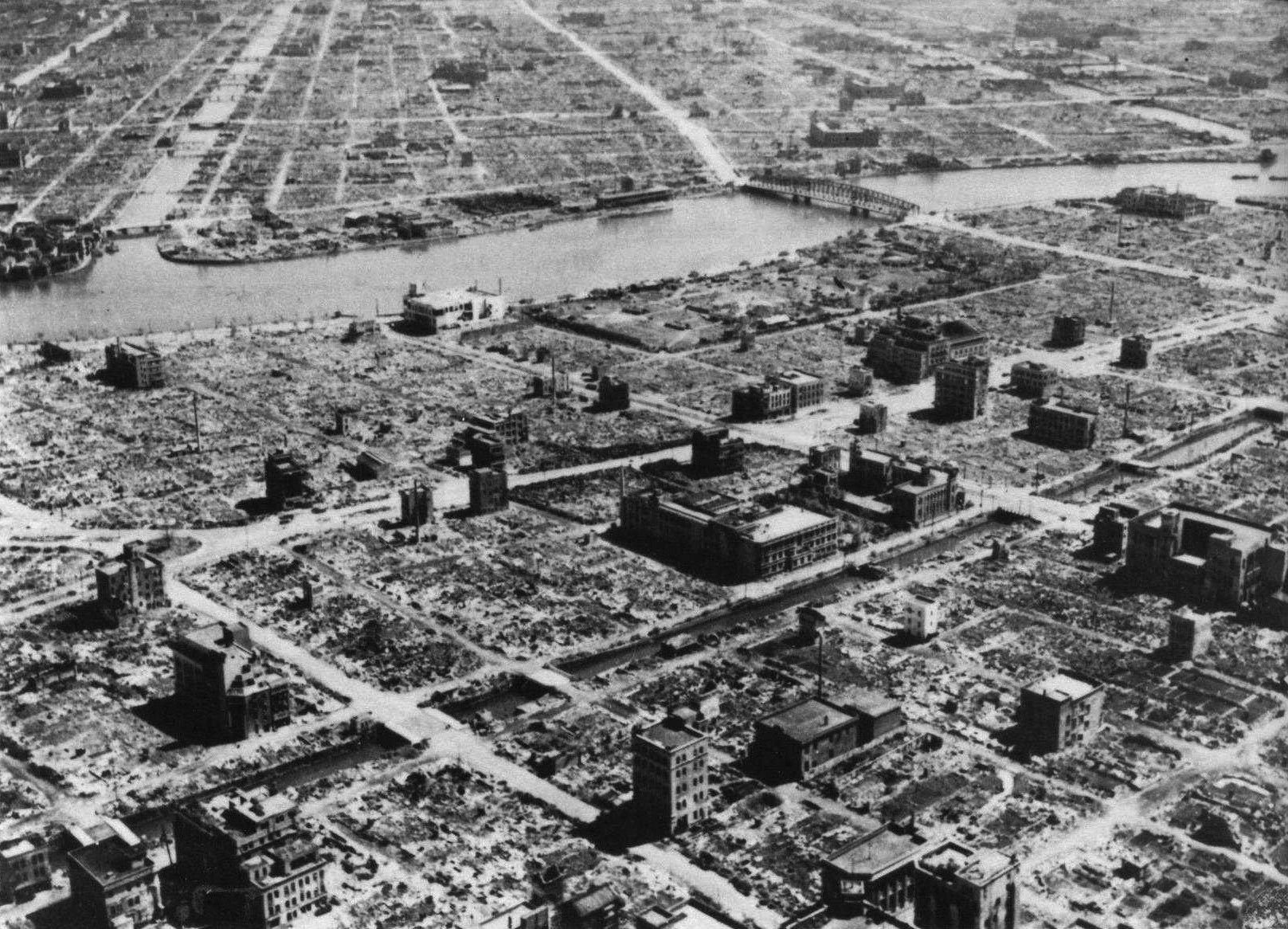
This Tokyo residential section was virtually destroyed after a massive firebombing raid by the U.S. Army Air Forces B-29s on March 9–10, 1945, the single most destructive raid in military aviation history. The bombing of Tokyo in World War II cut the city's industrial productivity in half.

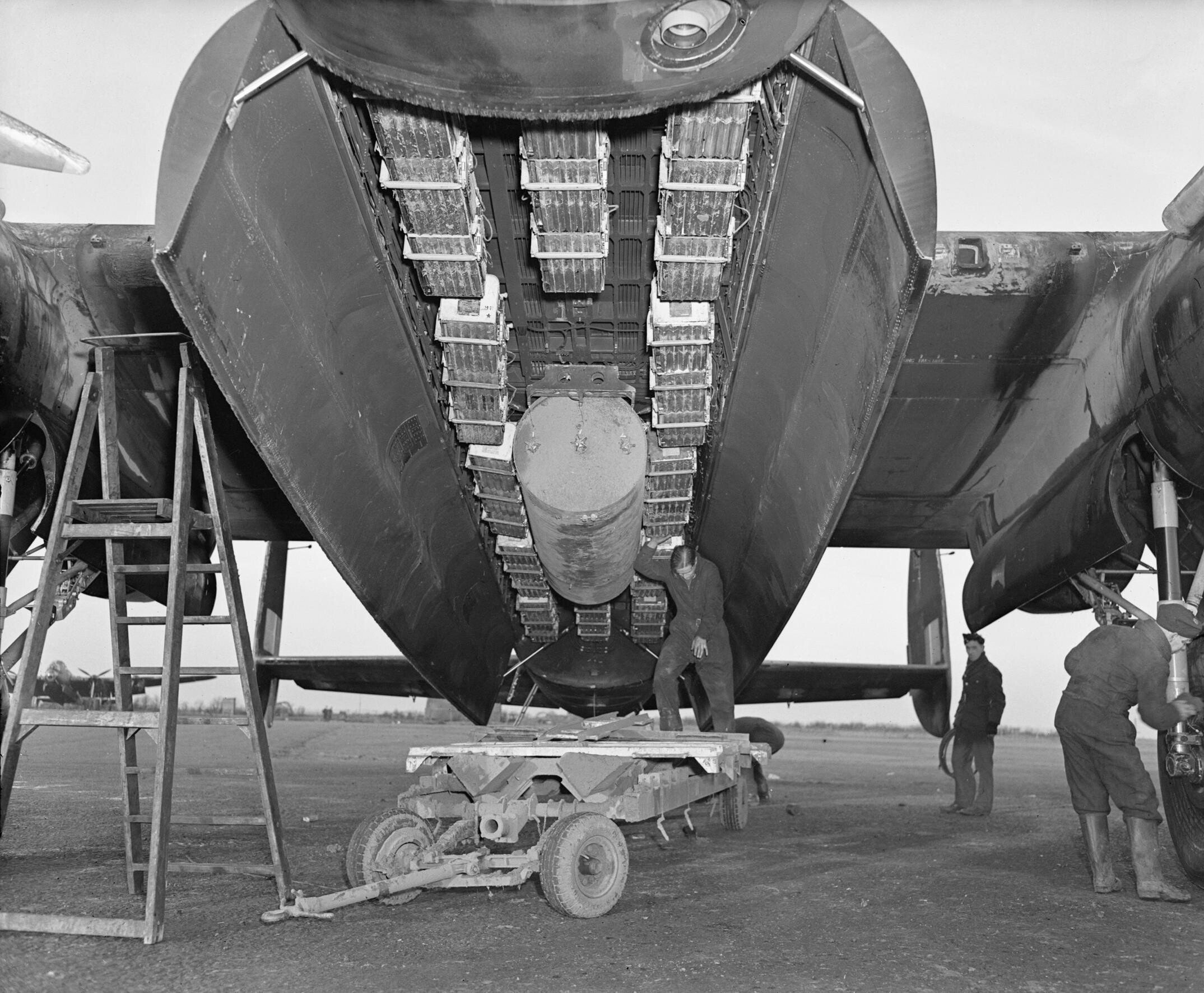
"Usual" British area bombing load of a 4000-pound blast bomb and 12 SBCs containing 2,832 4-lb incendiary bombs, seen in an Avro Lancaster, World War II

In military aviation, area bombardment or area bombing is a type of aerial bombardment in which bombs are dropped over the general area of a target. The term "area bombing" came into prominence during World War II. Area bombing is a form of strategic bombing. It can serve several intertwined purposes: to disrupt the production of military materiel, to disrupt lines of communications, to divert the enemy's industrial and military resources from the primary battlefield to air defence and infrastructure repair, and to demoralize the enemy's population (see terror bombing).

Carpet bombing, also known as "saturation bombing" and "obliteration bombing," refers to a type of area bombing that aims to effect complete destruction of the target area by exploding bombs in every part of it. The term "area bombing” refers to indiscriminate bombing of an area and also encompasses cases of carpet bombing, including obliteration bombing. It was used in that sense especially during World War II and the Korean War. Area bombing is contrasted with precision bombing. The latter is directed at a selected target – not necessarily a small, and not a necessarily tactical target, as it could be an airfield or a factory – and it does not intend to inflict widespread damage.

== See also ==
- Aerial bombardment and international law
- Aerial bombing of cities
- Atrocity crime
- Carpet bombing
- Civilian casualties of strategic bombing
- Firestorm
- High-level bombing
- Precision-guided munition
- Tactical bombing
- World War II
- Korean War
