= Bombing of La Garriga =

Attack by military aircraft during the Spanish Civil War

- Part of Spanish Civil War
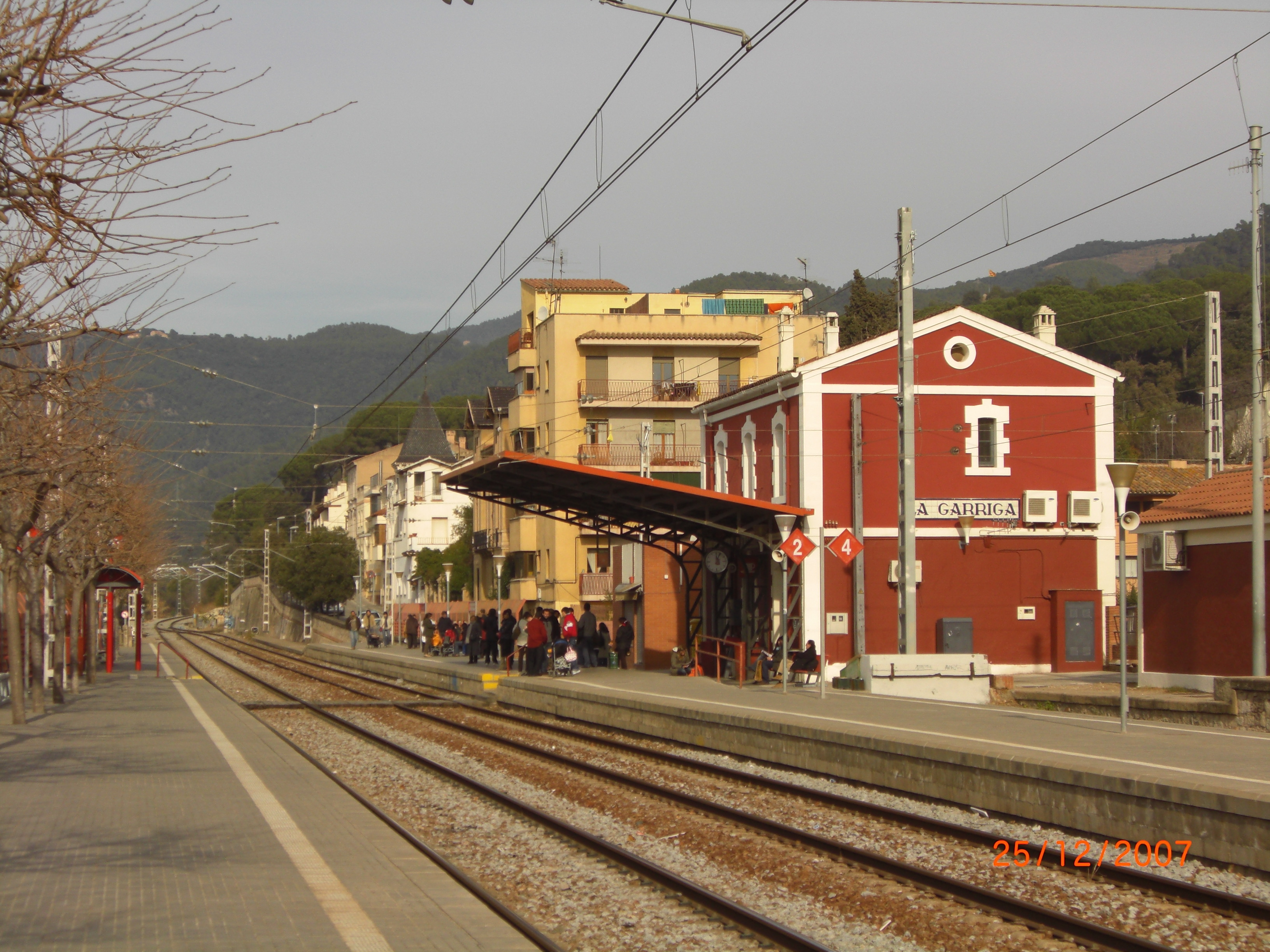
- The present-day reconstructed station of La Garriga.
Date	28–29 January 1939
Location	La Garriga, Catalonia, Spain 41°41′N 02°17′E

Belligerents
Spanish Republican Army	Nationalist Army; Corpo Truppe Volontarie

Casualties and losses
≥13 civilians killed	None

The Bombing of La Garriga was a series of Nationalist air raids which took place at La Garriga, Barcelona province in Catalonia between 28 and 29 January 1939 during the Spanish Civil War. At least 13 civilians were killed in the bombings.

== Background. ==
On 26 January, the Nationalist troops occupied Barcelona and 28 January Granollers, but they halted their offensive briefly. The Republican civilians and soldiers fled to the north and the Nationalist air force, the Legion Condor and the Aviazione Legionaria bombed the roads and towns between Barcelona and the French Frontier.

== The bombing ==
La Garriga was a tiny town of 10,000 inhabitants (among them 7,000 refugees from Madrid and the Basque Country), without air defenses. On 28 January, the retreating Lister's troops left the town and fled to the north and the following day ten Italian Savoia-Marchetti bombers, bombed the town. On 29 January, the Italian bombers, attacked the town again. There were 13 civilian deaths, among them five refugees and seven children.

== Aftermath ==
The Nationalist troops occupied La Garriga on 1 February.

== See also ==
- Aviazione Legionaria
