= Bombing of Osaka =

Air raids of the US Air Force in Japan

- Part of the air raids on Japan during the Pacific War
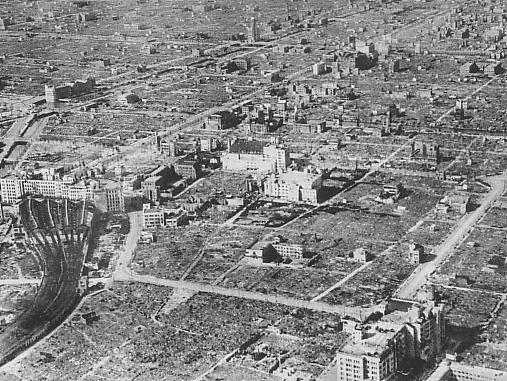
- Namba area after the bombing.
Date	1945
Location	Osaka, Japan
Result	American victory

Belligerents
United States	Japan

Strength
133 bombers	

Casualties and losses
30 aircraft destroyed	Over 10,000 civilians killed (most common estimates); Over 500,000 homeless

The bombing of Osaka (大阪大空襲, Ōsaka daikūshū) during the Pacific War was part of the strategic bombing air raids on Japan campaign waged by the United States against military and civilian targets and population centers in Japan. It first took place from the middle of the night on March 13, 1945, to the early morning of the next day. There were also bomb raids on June 1, 6, 7, 15, 26, July 10, 24, and August 14, the last day of the war. It is estimated that more than 10,000 civilians died in these bombings.

== Background ==
Osaka was the second largest city in Japan, with a population of 3,252,340 in 1940. Traditionally, it was the most important industrial concentration in the Far East. Osaka was one of the principal centers of heavy industry, noted for its shipbuilding, iron, steel, rolling stock works, as well as non-ferrous metals enterprises (notably copper and aluminum). In addition, it was noted for its production of aircraft propellers and propeller governors, munitions and ordnance, textiles, special steels, wires, electrical equipment, chemicals, instruments, and machines and machine tools, particularly anti-friction bearings. It was also a transportation hub and home to Japan's third largest port. Much work had been done to develop its naturally shallow harbor, and it was also the center of Japan's rail network.

== Raids ==
=== March firebombing ===
The first air raid on Osaka lasted for about three and a half hours from 23:57 on March 13, 1945, to 03:25. A total of 274 B-29 heavy bombers attacked Osaka. The first wave of 43 bombers of the 314th Bombardment Wing arrived from Guam island. It was a low-level night raid from an altitude of about 2,000m. The first bombers dropped incendiary bombs at targets in the Minato ward which started a firestorm. The second wave of 107 bombers of the 313th Bombardment wing arrived from Tinian and attacked the Naniwa ward. Finally, 124 bombers of the 878th Bombardment Squadron from Saipan arrived and attacked the Kita and Nishi wards. This bombing raid resulted in 3,987 dead and 678 missing and destroyed 8.1 square miles (21 km2) of the city for the loss of two aircraft (B-29-45-BW Superfortress 42-24754 499th BG, 878th BS).

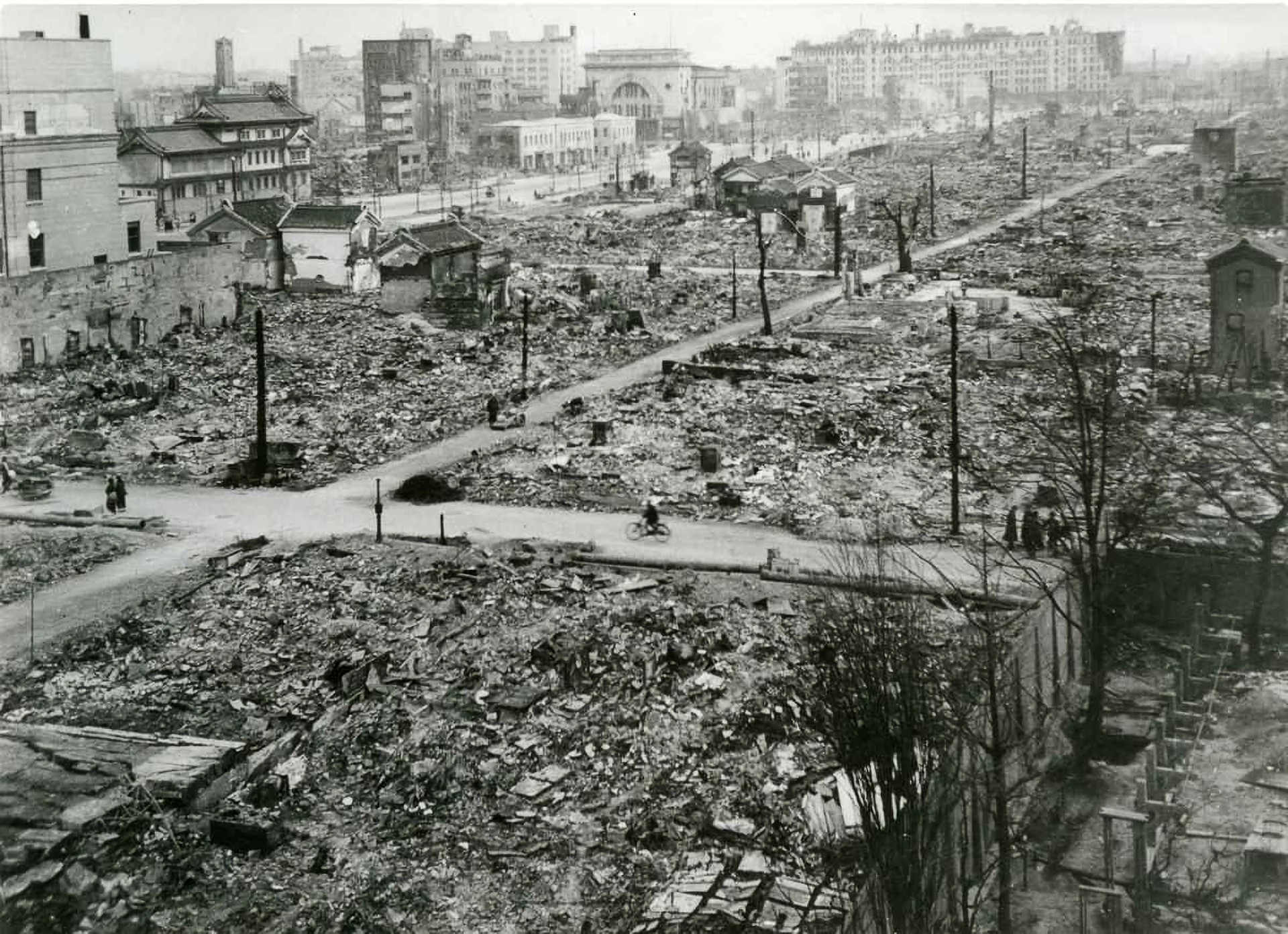
Near Shinsaibashi after the Osaka air raids. The Takashimaya Osaka store is in the back right.

The bombing raid resulted in 3,987 dead and 678 missing and destroyed 8.1 square miles (21 km2) of the city for the loss of two aircraft, one by accident. 274 aircraft dropped a total of 1,733 tons of bombs on the urban area of Osaka. The destruction of Osaka was almost entirely concentrated in one area southwest of Osaka Castle. The U.S. suffered no crew casualties during the mission. The aircraft lost from the accident crashed and burned on take-off, but all crew members escaped.

=== June and July raids ===
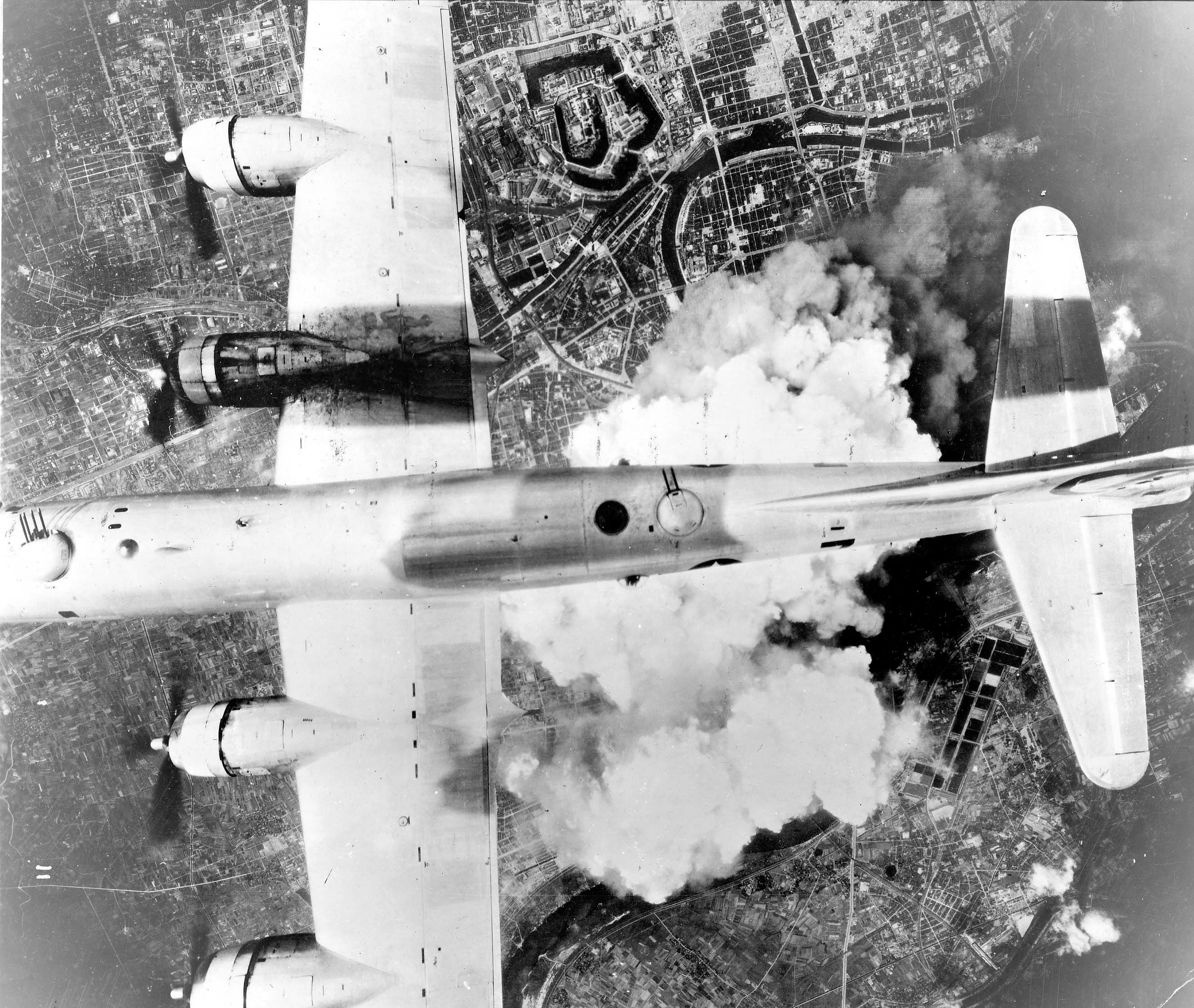
A B-29 over Osaka on 1 June 1945

On the first day of June, 521 B-29s escorted by 148 P-51s were dispatched in a daylight raid against Osaka. While en route to the city the P-51D Mustangs flew through thick clouds, and 27 of the fighters were destroyed in collisions. Nevertheless, 458 heavy bombers and 27 P-51s reached the city and the bombardment killed 3,960 Japanese and destroyed 3.15 square miles (8.2 km2) of buildings.

A force of 409 B-29s attacked Osaka again on 7 June; during this attack 2.21 square miles (5.7 km2) of buildings were burnt out and the Americans did not suffer any losses.

Osaka was bombed for the fourth time in the month on 15 June when 444 B-29s destroyed 1.9 square miles (4.9 km2) of the city and another 0.59 square miles (1.5 km2) of nearby Amagasaki; 300,000 houses were destroyed in Osaka.

On 24 July, 625 B-29s were dispatched against seven targets near Nagoya and Osaka. On the night of 6/7 July the 315th Bombardment Wing destroyed the Maruzen oil refinery near Osaka, and three nights later it completed the destruction of the Utsube refinery.

=== August 14, 1945 raid ===
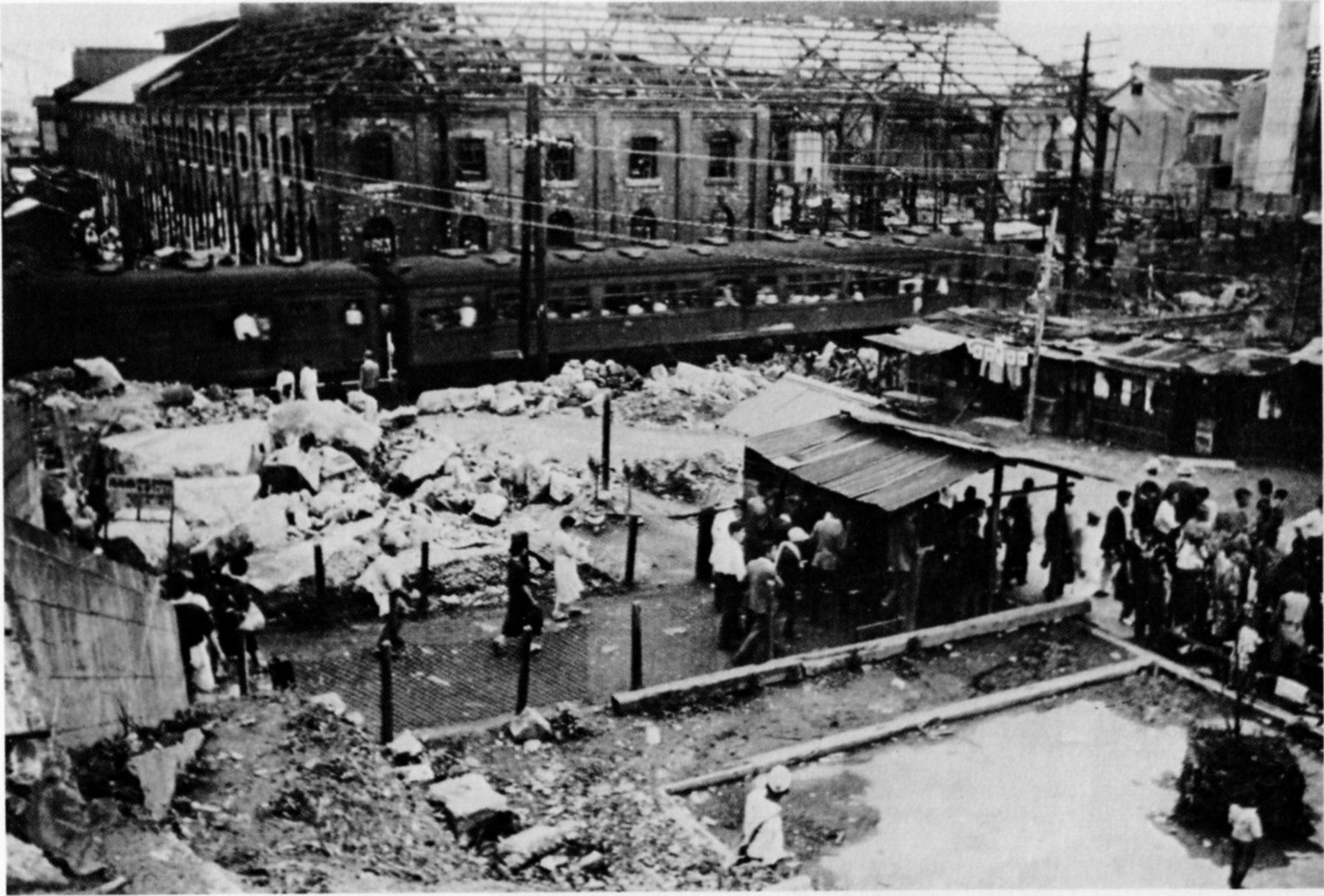
Kyobashi Station in June 1946 (ten months after the raid)

The eighth bomb raid was executed on August 14, 1945, the day before the end of the war. 145 B-29's raided Osaka. They dropped about 700 1-ton bombs, targeting the Japanese Army's factories in Eastern Osaka. Four units of 1-ton bombs were also dropped onto Kyobashi Station of the Japan National Railway nearby around 1pm, resulting in substantial damage to the civilian-filled station. This air raid was also called "Kyobashi Station Bomb Raid".

There were two trains that had just arrived at the station when the bombs were dropped. The victims of the air raid in this station counted more than 210 dead civilians identified, more than 500 unidentified.

== Other bombings near Osaka ==
- Bombing of Kobe
- Bombing of Nagoya

== See also ==
- Bombing of Tokyo
- Battle of Okinawa
- Battle of Iwo Jima
- Evacuations of civilians in Japan during World War II
- Grave of the Fireflies (short story), a semi-autobiographical short story set during the bombing
