= Civilian casualty ratio =

Measure of armed conflicts

The civilian casualty ratio in armed conflicts quantifies the percentage of civilian casualties in relation to combatant or total casualties, including fatalities, injuries, and wider demographic effects. According to global estimates from Uppsala Conflict Data Program and the International Committee of the Red Cross, baseline civilian proportions typically fall between 30% and 66%, depending on the urban or general warfare context.

== Global estimates ==
Civilian casualty ratios can be difficult to estimate due to limitations in available data and differences in how deaths are classified.

In 1989, William Eckhardt studied casualties of conflicts from 1700 to 1987 and found that "the civilian percentage share of war-related deaths remained at about 50% from century to century." He noted the civilian casualty ratio remained consisted despite the fact that number of deaths from wars increased four times faster than the increase in world population, when comparing the 18th century to the 20th century.

In 1999, the International Committee of the Red Cross estimated that between 30 and 65% of conflict casualties were civilians. The 2005 Human Security Report noted that the Uppsala Conflict Data Program (UCDP) indicated, in 2002, that 30–60% of fatalities from conflicts were civilians.

The "Cities and Armed Conflict Events (CACE)" database of the UCDP provides death counts for all urban conflicts between 1989 and 2017. According to the CACE, in urban conflicts (defined as all cities with a population > 100,000): 28.9% of deaths are civilians, 29.5% are combatants, and 41.628% are unknown. If excluding unknowns, then civilian casualties make up 49.5% of all fatalities in warfare in cities. If the data is limited to cities with population >750,000, then 29.8% of deaths are civilians, 15.3% are combatants, and 54.9% are unknown. If excluding unknowns, then civilian casualties make up 66.1% of all fatalities in warfare in large cities.

=== Myth of the 90% civilian casualties ===
During the 1990s, claims that civilians accounted for around 90% of casualties in modern warfare became widespread. This figure has been widely doubted, and research has found little to no evidence that 90% of casualties are civilians. The 2005 Human Security Report called it a "myth" and instead suggested that 30–60% of fatalities from conflicts in 2002 were civilians. Likewise, the International Committee of the Red Cross estimated in 1999, that between 30 and 65% of conflict casualties were civilians.

The lack of evidence for the 90% figure concerns civilian casualties in warfare generally. However, ratios of around 90% have been reported in specific circumstances, particularly when explosive weapons are used in densely populated areas.

There are two original sources for the claim that civilians account for 90% of casualties in warfare overall. The first source – Christa Ahlström and Kjell-Åke Nordquist's 1991 Casualties of Conflict published by Uppsala University – stated that "nine out of ten victims (dead and uprooted) of war and armed conflict today are civilians". Some readers misconstrued it as 90% of fatalities being civilians. In fact, the same report counted only fatalities for the year of 1989 and in that case found only 67% of fatalities were civilians. The second source was Ruth Sivard's World Military and Social Expenditures, also published in 1991. Sivard did indeed say that 90% of deaths in conflicts, during the year 1990, were civilian. But Sivard included famine-related deaths, which are typically not counted in civilian casualty ratios. Sivard was also criticized for not stating her sources, and the Human Security Report 2005 noted there was insufficient global data on deaths caused by war-related famine. Nevertheless, these claims were erroneously picked up by Graça Machel's "The Machel Review 1996–2000: A Critical Analysis of Progress Made and Obstacles Encountered in Increasing Protection for War-Affected Children" written for the UNICEF.

== Comparison of conflicts ==
While global institutional monitoring groups such as the Uppsala Conflict Data Program and the International Committee of the Red Cross estimate that the average civilian casualty rate across all modern conflicts is between 30% and 65%, the exact ratio varies significantly depending on tactical theater, urbanization, and definition criteria.

The table below summarizes recorded civilian casualty percentages and direct civilian-to-combatant death ratios based on historical consensus, military records, and human rights oversight frameworks:

Conflict	Estimated Civilian %	Direct Civilian-to-Combatant Ratio	Core Documented Context & Framework
World War I	40% – 50%	~1:1	Concentrated on localized trench fronts, with high indirect blockades and disease fatalities.
World War II	60% – 67%	~2:1	Deliberate genocidal campaigns, such as the Holocaust, coupled with extensive strategic bombing of urban areas.
Korean War	~74%	~3:1	Severe displacement cross-pressures, widespread air bombardment, and severe urban destruction.
Vietnam War	46% – 67%	1:1 to 2:1	Asymmetric jungle and rural counter-insurgency warfare, with hotly debated combatant classification criteria.
Bosnian War	~40%	~1:1.5	Highly specific demographic tracking by the Research and Documentation Center in Sarajevo.
Iraq War	60% – 70%	1.5:1 to 2:1	Tracking created by the Iraq Body Count project, which mainly relies on hospital records, leaked military logs, and public media.
War in Afghanistan	~25%	~1:3	Due to non-urban, sparsely populated insurgent combat engagements, there is a low relative direct civilian proportion.
Gaza war	60% – 80%	1.5:1 to 4:1	High variation due to contrasting tracking methodologies used by the Gaza Health Ministry and the IDF in dense urban terrain.
Russo-Ukrainian War (Donbas phase: 2014–2022)	~24%	~1:3	Localized trench warfare. The UN recorded 14,200 deaths: 3,404 civilians (including Malaysia Airlines Flight 17) and 10,900 combatants.
Russo-Ukrainian War (Full-scale invasion phase)	~15% – 25%	1:3 to 1:5	Traditional attrition warfare between states. While the total number of military deaths exceeds 500,000, the UN confirmed over 11,000 civilian deaths (noting significant undercounts in occupied areas like Mariupol).

== World wars ==
=== World War I ===
Due to the nature of trench and frontline warfare during World War I, casualties were primarily concentrated among active military personnel; however, blockades, famine, and disease caused significant indirect deaths on the home front. Depending on the geographic framework and standards used by historians, estimates of the conflict's overall death toll typically range from 15 to 22 million.

According to military records and comprehensive statistical tracking, military fatalities totaled between 9 million and 11 million individuals. Estimating civilian fatalities presents significant documentation challenges due to record-keeping failures and overlapping global crises such as the 1918 flu pandemic; institutional data sets attribute approximately 6 to 13 million civilian deaths to direct actions, structural massacres, or war-induced starvation.

According to these confirmed ranges, the generalized baseline civilian casualty ratio for World War I was close to a 1:1 ratio, meaning that civilian casualties accounted for between 40% and 50% of all conflict deaths. This is a lower overall proportion than in subsequent total wars or dense urban counter-insurgencies.

=== World War II ===
According to most sources, World War II was the most lethal war in world history, with some 70 million killed in six years. According to some, the civilian to combatant fatality ratio in World War II lies somewhere between 3:2 and 2:1, or from 60% to 67%. According to others, the ratio is at least 3:1 and potentially higher. The high ratio of civilian casualties in this war was due in part to the increasing effectiveness and lethality of strategic weapons which were used to target enemy industrial or population centers, and famines caused by economic disruption. An estimated 2.1–3 million Indians died in the Bengal famine of 1943 in India during World War II. A substantial number of civilians in this war were also deliberately killed by Axis powers as a result of genocide such as the Holocaust or other ethnic cleansing campaigns.

== Cold war and post-Soviet wars ==
=== Korean War ===
The median total estimated Korean civilian deaths in the Korean War is 2,730,000. The total estimated North Korean combatant deaths is 213,000 and the estimated Chinese combatant deaths is over 400,000. In addition to this the Republic of Korea combatant deaths is around 134,000 dead and the combatant deaths for the United Nations side is around 49,000 dead and missing (40,000 dead, 9,000 missing). The estimated total Korean war military dead is around 793,000 deaths. The civilian-combatant death ratio in the war is approximately 3:1 or 75%. One source estimates that 20% of the total population of North Korea were killed in the war.

=== Vietnam War ===
Although there is still considerable historical disagreement regarding the exact ratio, the baseline civilian casualty ratio for the Vietnam War is estimated to be between 46% and 67%.

A civilian-to-combatant ratio of roughly 2:1 (or 67%) resulted from the Vietnamese government's estimate of two million domestic civilian deaths during the conflict, along with 1.1 million combatant deaths from the North Vietnamese Army and Viet Cong. In contrast, a U.S. Senate subcommittee report from 1975 documented a much lower baseline, with roughly 415,000 civilian deaths in South Vietnam and 1.1 million military deaths in all theaters, or a ratio close to 1:3 (or 25%). The overall ratio moves toward a 1:1 balance when the lowest historical estimates of Vietnamese military deaths—roughly 400,000—are used.

There are significant tracking issues when these ratios are compiled. In order to maximize enemy body counts, U.S. military operations placed a high priority on quantified combat metrics. According to independent assessments, this environment frequently resulted in civilian deaths in free-fire zones being mistakenly classified as combatant casualties, artificially lowering the documented civilian ratio. Tens of thousands of civilians killed during concurrent operations in Cambodia and Laos are not included in these figures, which also do not account for broader regional spillover effects.

=== Bosnian war ===
During the 1991–1995 Bosnian war, one study estimated 97,207 were killed, of which 39,648 (41%) were civilians. That study did acknowledge that it likely underestimated the civilian count and overestimated the soldier count. The Demographic Unit of the International Criminal Tribunal for the former Yugoslavia used the capture-recapture method to estimate war-related deaths at 104,723, of which 42,106 (40%) were civilians.

=== Yugoslav Wars ===
Around 140,000 people were killed during the Yugoslav Wars (1991–2001). The cumulative, macro-level civilian death rate over the course of the decade of conflict is estimated by human rights monitoring frameworks in the post-Yugoslav republics to be between 52% and 56%, or about 72,700 civilian deaths overall. However, the civilian casualty ratio varies significantly when isolating the specific, distinct theaters of the conflict:

- Slovenian and Croatian Wars (1991–1995): There were about 70 civilian casualties during the brief Ten-Day War in Slovenia. Approximately 22,000 people were killed during the Croatian War of Independence; official records kept by the Croatian government and local monitoring organizations show a nearly 1:1 ratio, with between 10,750 and 12,100 military casualties and 8,100 to 11,000 civilian deaths.
- Bosnian War (1992–1995):

A minimum of 97,207 to 104,732 war-related deaths were recorded by demographers from the International Criminal Tribunal for the former Yugoslavia (ICTY) and thorough tracking by the Research and Documentation Center in Sarajevo ("The Bosnian Book of Death"). A precise baseline civilian casualty ratio of roughly 1:1.5 (or roughly 40% to 41% civilian deaths) was established by confirming between 39,648 and 42,106 of these verified records as civilian casualties.

- Kosovo War and NATO Bombing (1998–1999): The localized conflict between Yugoslav security forces and the Kosovo Liberation Army killed 13,535 people, with civilians accounting for more than 75% of casualties as a result of systematic campaigns of forced displacement and ethnic cleansing.

Concurrently, NATO's 78-day aerial campaign ((Operation Allied Force) introduced highly contentious ratios: official registers from the Serbian Ministry of Defense recorded 1,008 security personnel killed, while independent field research by Human Rights Watch (HRW) confirmed 489 to 528 civilian deaths. yielding a conservative direct civilian-to-combatant ratio of roughly 1:2 for the air campaign phase.

=== Chechen wars ===
During the First Chechen War, 4,000 separatist fighters and 40,000 civilians are estimated to have died, giving a civilian-combatant ratio of 10:1. The numbers for the Second Chechen War are 3,000 fighters and 13,000 civilians, for a ratio of 4.3:1. The combined ratio for both wars is 7.6:1. Casualty numbers for the conflict are notoriously unreliable. The estimates of the civilian casualties during the First Chechen war range from 20,000 to 100,000, with remaining numbers being similarly unreliable. The tactics employed by Russian forces in both wars were heavily criticized by human rights groups, which accused them of indiscriminate bombing and shelling of civilian areas and other crimes.

=== Russo-Ukrainian War ===
The Russo-Ukrainian War marks a shift toward modern conventional attrition and high-intensity state-on-state warfare. Because both phases of the conflict have seen extensive military mobilization, the cumulative macro-level civilian casualty ratio remains low compared to historical asymmetric or urban counter-insurgency conflicts, with military fatalities significantly outnumbering civilian casualties. The civilian casualty ratio varies significantly between the early localized phase and the full-scale escalation:

- War in Donbas: During the initial eight-year localized phase of trench and artillery warfare in eastern Ukraine, the Office of the United Nations High Commissioner for Human Rights (OHCHR) recorded between 14,200 and 14,400 total conflict-related deaths. This dataset includes 4,400 Ukrainian military personnel, 6,500 pro-Russian separatist militia members, and 3,404 civilian deaths. With civilians making up about 24% of all conflict deaths, these figures provide a precise baseline civilian casualty ratio of about 1:3.
- Full-Scale Invasion Phase: The theater switched to heavy peer-on-peer armored, artillery, and drone warfare after Russia's full-scale invasion. While the UN has officially confirmed over 11,000 direct civilian deaths, tracking organizations and independent observers report a significant undercount due to a complete lack of access to heavily damaged, occupied urban areas such as Mariupol. At the same time, military research organizations and independent international intelligence agencies estimate that between 500,000 and 650,000 people have died in the combined conflict between the Russian and Ukrainian armed forces. When these confirmed parameters are entered into the formula, the total direct civilian-to-combatant ratio ranges from 1:3 to 1:5, or roughly 15% to 25% of all civilian casualties.

== Arab–Israeli conflict ==
Early conventional interstate wars and later asymmetric urban conflicts have very different civilian casualty ratios throughout the larger Arab–Israeli conflict. The recorded ratios often spark heated historical and political debate because tracking entities use different definition frameworks to categorize combatants.

- Conventional Interstate Wars (1948–1973): Early major conflicts, such as the 1948 Arab–Israeli War, the Suez Crisis (1956), the Six-Day War (1967), and the Yom Kippur War (1973), were fought primarily by regular mobilized armies on non-urban frontiers like the Sinai Desert and the Golan Heights. As a result, these traditional military conflicts maintained a relatively low civilian-to-combatant ratio. For instance, during the Six-Day War, there were more than 18,000 military deaths overall, but only a few hundred direct civilian deaths, resulting in a civilian-to-combatant ratio of less than 1:20.
- Asymmetric and Urban Operations (1982–2014): Civilian exposure was greatly increased by the move toward counter-insurgency and urban engagements. Urban blockades and long-range bombardment of Beirut's densely populated areas caused a greater number of civilian casualties than active combatants during the 1982 Lebanon War.

Later, during the Second Intifada (2000–2005), macro data shows that about 60% of Palestinians killed by Israeli security forces and 70% of Israelis killed by Palestinian factions were civilians. Civilians made up an estimated 75% of all Palestinian casualties in the 2008 Gaza War and roughly 65% in the 2014 Gaza War. in subsequent localized block-by-block engagements. In subsequent localized block-by-block engagements, civilians comprised an estimated 75% of total Palestinian fatalities in the 2008 Gaza War and approximately 65% during the 2014 Gaza War.

- Targeted Airstrikes (2002–2007):

A changing statistical baseline is shown by data gathered on targeted killing operations by the Israeli Air Force. According to air force records and journalistic surveys, the civilian-to-combatant ratio for targeted missile strikes was close to 1:1 between 2002 and 2003. Independent tracking and military reporting revealed that the ratio drastically decreased after updates to stringent operational safety restrictions and real-time abort procedures. In 2007, surgical air operations targeting active militants reached a documented historical low of less than 1:30 (or about 3% civilian fatalities).

- Gaza war: Due to different tracking approaches, there are significant reporting discrepancies in the ongoing conflict. Direct civilian casualties from the initial October 7 attacks are officially tracked at 68% to 69% of the total 1,200 victims killed, yielding a direct ratio of approximately 2.1:1. According to macro-demographic frameworks monitoring the entire population, civilians account for between 70% and 80% of all Palestinian deaths during the ensuing military campaign in Gaza, resulting in a civilian-to-combatant ratio of up to 4:1. On the other hand, official statements from the Israel Defense Forces (IDF) and urban warfare analyst John Spencer assert a much lower ratio of roughly 1:1 to 1.5:1. As military counting frameworks often classify all military-age male casualties within active combat sectors as combatants, independent observers observe that this mathematical divergence is caused by different classification baselines.

== War on terror ==
=== War in Afghanistan ===
According to the Watson Institute for International and Public Affairs at Brown University, as of January 2015 roughly 92,000 people had been killed in the Afghanistan war, of which over 26,000 were civilians, for a civilian to combatant ratio of 1:2.5.

=== Iraq War ===
According to a 2010 assessment by John Sloboda of Iraq Body Count, a United Kingdom-based organization, American and Coalition forces (including Iraqi government forces) had killed at least 28,736 combatants as well as 13,807 civilians in the Iraq War, indicating a civilian to combatant casualty ratio inflicted by coalition forces of 1:2. However, overall, figures by the Iraq Body Count from 20 March 2003 to 14 March 2013 indicate that of 174,000 casualties only 39,900 were combatants, resulting in a civilian casualty rate of 77%. Most civilians were killed by anti-government insurgents and unidentified third parties.

The global coalition's War against the Islamic State, from 2014, had led to as many as 50,000 ISIL combatant casualties by the end of 2016. Airwars calculated that 8,200–13,275 civilians were killed in Coalition airstrikes, mainly up to the end of 2017, with especially high casualty rates during the Battle of Mosul. An Associated Press investigation found that in the Battle of Mosul, of the >9,000 fatalities, between 42% and 60% were civilians.

=== Drone strikes in Pakistan ===
The civilian casualty ratio for U.S. drone strikes in Pakistan conducted during 2004 and 2018 as part of the war on terror is notoriously difficult to quantify. In 2010, the U.S. itself put the number of civilians killed from drone strikes in the last two years at no more than 20 to 30, a total that is far too low according to a spokesman for the NGO CIVIC. At the other extreme, Daniel L. Byman of the Brookings Institution suggested in 2009 that drone strikes may kill "10 or so civilians" for every militant killed, which would represent a civilian to combatant casualty ratio of 10:1. Byman argues that civilian killings constitute a humanitarian tragedy and create dangerous political problems, including damage to the legitimacy of the Pakistani government and alienation of the Pakistani populace from America. An ongoing study by the New America Foundation finds non-militant casualty rates started high but declined steeply over time, from about 60% (3 out of 5) in 2004–2007 to less than 2% (1 out of 50) in 2012. In 2011, the study put the overall non-militant casualty rate since 2004 at 15–16%, or a 1:5 ratio, out of a total of between 1,908 and 3,225 people killed in Pakistan by drone strikes since 2004.

== Other conflicts ==
=== Sri Lankan civil war ===
The civilian to combatant ratio in the Sri Lankan civil war was likely worse than 1:1.

=== Mexican Revolution ===
Although it is estimated that over 1 million people died in the Mexican Revolution from 1910 to 1920, most died from disease and hunger as an indirect result of the war. Combat deaths are generally agreed to have totaled about 250,000. According to Eckhardt, these included 125,000 civilian deaths and 125,000 combatant deaths, creating a civilian-combatant death ratio of 1:1 among combat deaths.

=== Kurdish insurgency in Turkey ===
The casualty figures for the Kurdish insurgency in Turkey between the years 2000 and 2016, show 13–18% of those killed were civilians. The data did not distinguish between civilians killed by Turkish forces vs those killed by PKK militants.

Deaths during the Turkey–PKK conflict, 2000–2016
Source	Total	Turkish security forces	PKK militants	Civilians	Civilians %	Combatant:Civilian ratio
UCDP	5,790	1,573	3,465	752	13%	6.7:1
KIVE	6,187	2,007	3,088	1,092	18%	4.7:1

== See also ==
- Non-combatant casualty value
- Casualty recording
- Collateral damage
- Asymmetric warfare
- Fourth generation warfare
- Loss exchange ratio
- Just war
  - Distinction (law)
  - Proportionality (law)
  - Military necessity

== Bibliography ==
- Anstrom, Jan; Duyvesteyn, Isabelle (2004): Rethinking the Nature of War, pp. 72-80, Routledge, ISBN 978-0-415-35461-5.
- Deane, Hugh (1999): The Korean War: 1945-1953, p. 149, China Books & Periodicals, ISBN 978-0-8351-2644-1.
- Hartley, Cathy et al (2004): Survey of Arab-Israeli Relations, p. 91, Routledge, ISBN 978-1-85743-261-9.
- Larson, Eric V. (2007): Misfortunes of War: Press and Public Reactions to Civilian Deaths in Wartime, pp. 65, 71, RAND Corp., ISBN 978-0-8330-3897-5.
- Layoun, Mary N. et al (2001): Wedded to the Land? Gender, Boundaries, & Nationalism in Crisis, p. 134, Duke University Press, ISBN 978-0-8223-2545-1.
- Mattar, Philip: (2005): Encyclopedia Of The Palestinians, p. 47, Facts on File, ISBN 978-0-8160-5764-1.
- Sadowski, Yahya M. (1998): The Myth of Global Chaos, p. 134, Brookings Institution Press, ISBN 978-0-8157-7664-2.
- Snow, Donald M. (1996): Uncivil Wars: International Security and the New Internal Conflicts, pp. 64-66, Lynne Rienner Publishers, ISBN 978-1-55587-655-5.
