= Human Security Gateway =

Database of research and information related to human security

The Human Security Gateway is a service run by the Human Security Report Project.

The Human Security Gateway is a database of research and information related to human security. Additions to the database are made daily, and it contains over 27,000 English and French-language resources related to conflict and human security. It is run by the Human Security Report Project.

== Overview ==
The Gateway "focuses attention on threats stemming from violence to individuals and to societies at risk". It uses an approach to gathering and categorizing information that is complementary to the "broad" conception of human security; this is the same definition of human security that the United Nations Development Programme (UNDP) used in its 1994 Human Development Report.

== Content ==
The Gateway offers users catalogued resources including reports, journal articles, and fact sheets. Its coverage ranges from the global to national (and sub-national) levels. Information is available in English and French, and via presentation formats such as:

- Regional Gateways focusing on regions,
- National Gateways,
- Topical Gateways,
- Customizable Updates.

The Gateway can be searched by keyword, geographic region, or subject heading, and an abstract can be viewed before downloading the full-text of the article or report. Subscribers can be notified of additions to the database, filtered by topic, region, language, or format, with feeds provided by email and RSS news feed.

Topics include: child soldiers; climate change; conflict prevention; criminal violence; gender; governance; health; human rights; humanitarian intervention; international law; landmines; natural resources; peacekeeping; post-conflict peacebuilding; small arms; refugees; and terrorism.

== See also ==
- Human Security Report 2005
- International Relations and Security Network
