= Taras Kuzio =

Ukrainian political scientist

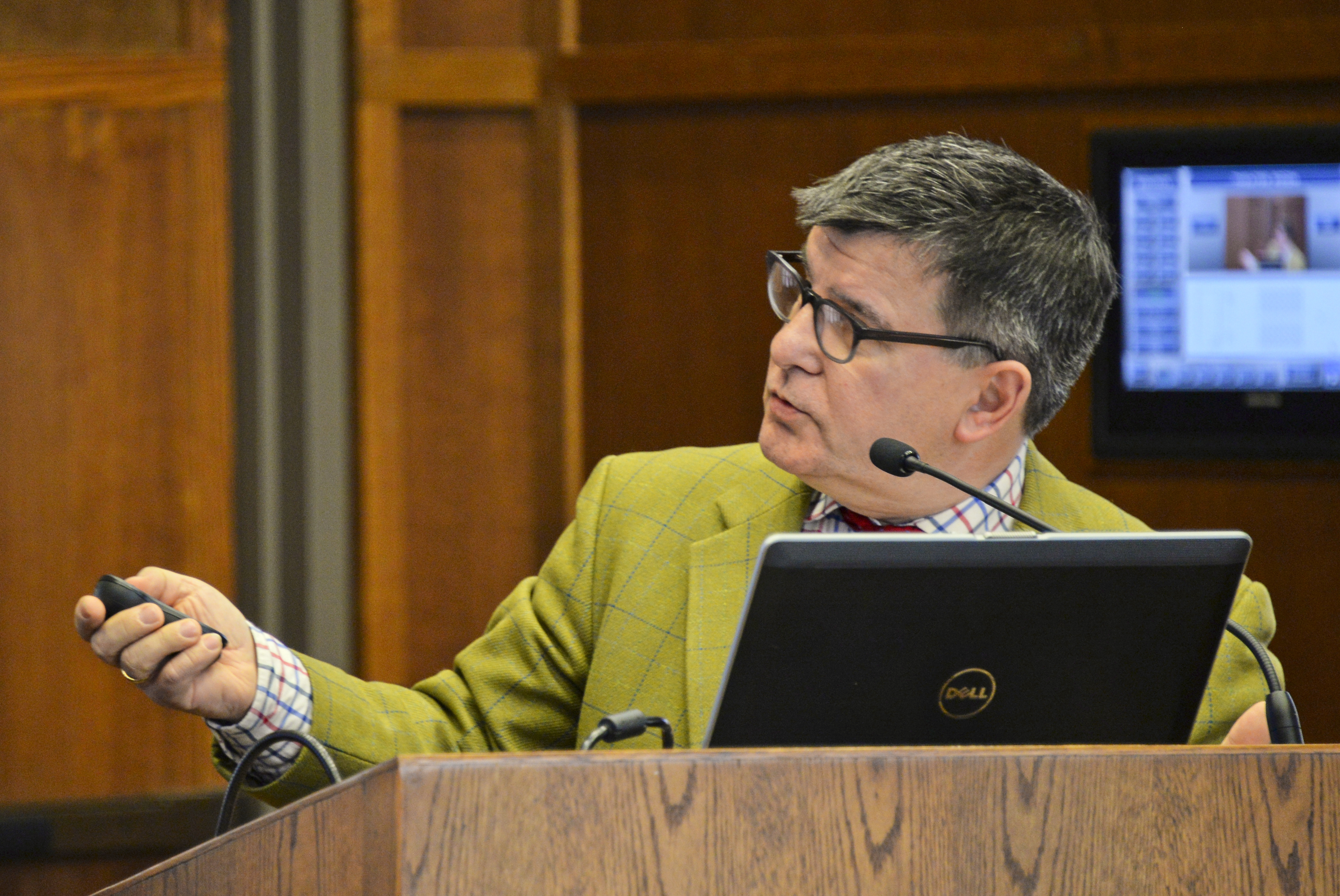
- Taras Kuzio in 2015
- Scientific career
- Fields: Political science

Taras Kuzio is a British Professor of Political Science at the National University of Kyiv-Mohyla Academy (Kyiv, Ukraine). His area of study is Russian and Ukrainian political, economic and security affairs.

== Education ==
Taras Kuzio is of Ukrainian descent.

He received a BA in economics from the University of Sussex, an MA in Soviet studies from the University of London and holds a doctorate in political science from the University of Birmingham.

== Career ==
In 1986, Kuzio, based in London, began compiling and translating information on current events in Soviet Ukraine and provided this information to the media through the Ukraine Press Agency (UPA) in Great Britain. UPA was a branch of the British-registered company Society for Soviet Nationalities Studies, which published the bi-monthly Soviet Nationalities Survey (which had been launched in 1984 and continued until 1991) and monthly Soviet Ukrainian Affairs (1987-89). The Society for Soviet Nationalities Studies was financially supported by the Prolog Research and Publishing Corporation. Unbeknownst to Kuzio, the organisations were funded by the US Central Intelligence Agency as part of its QRPLUMB Project. The CIA said it had no editorial input into UPA releases, which it described as "infiltration of the QRPLUMB product into the USSR".

From 1998-99, he was director of the NATO Information and Documentation Center in Kyiv, Ukraine.

In 2004-06, he was a visiting professor in George Washington University's Elliott School of International Affairs' Institute for European, Russian and Eurasian Studies (IERES).

In 2010-11, he was an Austrian Marshall Plan Foundation Visiting Fellow at the Center for Transatlantic Relations, School of Advanced International Studies, Johns Hopkins University in Washington D.C.

In 2011-12, he was a visiting fellow at the Slavic Research Center at Hokkaido University in Japan. Subsequently, he was a senior research associate at the Canadian Institute of Ukrainian Studies, University of Alberta.

His book, Russian Nationalism and the Russian-Ukrainian War (2022), was published prior to the 2022 Russian invasion of Ukraine. This follows two other books on Russia-Ukraine relations: Putin's War Against Ukraine: Revolution, Nationalism and Crime (2017) and Ukraine: Democratisation, Corruption and the New Russian Imperialism (2015), the latter of which surveys modern Ukrainian political history. He is the author and editor of sixteen books, including Open Ukraine. Changing Course towards a European Future From Kuchmagate to Orange Revolution (2013), Democratic Revolution in Ukraine (2011), Theoretical and Comparative Perspectives on Nationalism (2007) and Ukraine-Crimea-Russia: Triangle of Conflict (2007). He has also comparatively researched empire loyalism in Northern Ireland and Donbas.

He is an associate research fellow at the UK Henry Jackson Society think tank and has contributed to the Atlantic Council, Foreign Affairs, Kyiv Post, New Eastern Europe, and E-International Relations.

== Selected publications ==
Volumes Authored

- Kuzio, Taras (2022). Russian Nationalism and the Russian-Ukrainian War. Routledge. p. 280. ISBN 978-1-032-04317-3.
- Kuzio, Taras (2020). Crisis in Russian Studies? Nationalism (Imperialism), Racism and War. E-International Relations. p. 196. ISBN 978-1-910814-55-0.
- Kuzio, Taras (2017). Putin's War Against Ukraine. CreateSpace. p. 490. ISBN 978-1-5432-8586-4.
- Kuzio, Taras (2015). Ukraine: Democratization, Corruption, and the New Russian Imperialism. Praeger. p. 640. ISBN 978-1-4408-3502-5.
- Kuzio, Taras (2007a). Theoretical and Comparative Perspectives on Nationalism: New Directions in Cross-Cultural and Post-Communist Studies. Ibidem Press. p. 436. ISBN 978-3-89821-815-3.
- Kuzio, Taras (2007b). Ukraine-Crimea-Russia: Triangle of Conflict. Columbia University Press. p. 253. ISBN 978-3-89821-761-3.
- Kuzio, Taras (2000). Ukraine: Perestroika to Independence (2nd ed.). Palgrave Macmillan. p. 273. ISBN 0-312-21675-0.
- Kuzio, Taras (1998). Ukraine: State and Nation Building. Routledge. p. 316. ISBN 978-1-138-98635-0.
- Kuzio, Taras (1997). Ukraine under Kuchma: Political Reform, Economic Transformation and Security Policy in Independent Ukraine. Palgrave Macmillan. p. 297. ISBN 978-1-349-25746-1.

Volumes Edited

- Kuzio, Taras, ed. (2013). From Kuchmagate to Orange Revolution: Democratic Revolution in Ukraine. Routledge. p. 198. ISBN 978-0-415-84698-1.
- Kuzio, Taras; Hamilton, Daniel Sheldon, eds. (2011). Open Ukraine: Changing Course towards a European Future (PDF). Washington, DC: Center for Transatlantic Relations. ISBN 978-0-9848544-2-4.
- Kuzio, Taras, ed. (2007). Aspects of the Orange Revolution VI: Post-Communist Democratic Revolutions in Comparative Perspective (Soviet and Post-Soviet Politics and Society 68). Ibidem Press. p. 226. ISBN 978-3-89821-820-7.
- Kuzio, Taras, ed. (1998). Contemporary Ukraine: Dynamics of Post-Soviet Transformation. Routledge. p. 312. ISBN 978-0-7656-0224-4.

Volumes Co-Authored

- D'anieri, Paul; Kravchuk, Robert S.; Kuzio, Taras (1999). Politics And Society In Ukraine. Westview Press. p. 360. ISBN 978-0-8133-3538-4.

Think Tank Monographs

- The Crimea: Europe’s Next Flashpoint? (Washington DC: The Jamestown Foundation, November 2010), p. 38.
- EU and Ukraine: a turning point in 2004? ISS-EU Occasional Paper (Paris: Institute for Security Studies-EU, December 2003), p. 36.
- Ukraine. Back From the Brink, European Security Study 23 (London: Institute for European Defence and Security Studies, 1995), p. 39.
- Ukrainian Security Policy. Washington Paper 167 (Washington DC: The Center for Strategic & International Studies and Praeger, 1995), pp. 168.
- Russia-Crimea-Ukraine. Triangle of Conflict, Conflict Studies 267 (London: Research Institute for the Study of Conflict and terrorism, 1994), p. 35.
- Ukraine. The Unfinished Revolution. European Security Study 16 (London: Institute for European Defence and Security Studies, 1992), p. 41.
- Dissent in Ukraine under Gorbachev (A Collection of samizdat documents) (London: Ukrainian Press Agency, 1989), p. 53.
