= Supply chain collaboration =

In supply chain management, supply chain collaboration is defined as two or more autonomous firms working jointly to plan and execute supply chain operations. It can deliver substantial benefits and advantages to collaborators. It is known as a cooperative strategy when one or more companies or business units work together to create mutual benefits. There are two main types of supply chain collaboration: vertical collaboration and horizontal collaboration. Vertical collaboration is the collaboration when two or more organizations from different levels or stages in supply chain share their responsibilities, resources, and performance information to serve relatively similar end customers; while horizontal collaboration is an inter-organizational systemrelationship between two or more companies at the same level or stage in the supply chain in order to allow greater ease of work and cooperation towards achieving a common objective.

Supply chain collaboration should not be confused with 'Operational Collaboration'. Operational Collaboration is when a supplier checks in with a buying organization for example. Supplier Collaboration focuses on collaborative goals that deliver value to both the buying and selling organization.

== Different forms and approaches of supply chain collaboration ==
=== Collaborative communication ===
Collaborative communication is the contact and message transmission process among supply chain partners in terms of frequency, direction, mode, and influence strategy. Open, frequent, balanced, two-way, multilevel communications indicate close inter-firm relationships.

=== Collaborative Execution ===
Collaborative execution is the process of executing supply chain transactions in a collaborative manner. Suppliers will work with buyers to ensure the right quantity of materials is delivered in the right time as per the contract. As the purchase order goes through its life cycle of order to delivery, at each stage there needs to be a tight collaboration between the trading partners for correct and efficient execution.

=== Open Supply Chain Innovation ===
Inspired by the Open Innovation approach, supply chain networks can facilitate innovation platforms where n-tier supplier chain actors and partners beyond the supply chain network can collaborate, co-create, and co-innovate. The open supply chain collaboration builds upon three ambidextrous capabilities: knowledge exploration and exploitation, horizontal and vertical collaboration, incremental and radical innovation.

=== Coordinating contract ===
Coordinating contract is defined as a coordination mechanism that provides incentives to all of its members so that the decentralized supply chain behaves nearly or exactly the same as the integrated one, by specifying contract parameters such as quantity, price, quality and deadlines, contracts are designed to improve supplier-buyer relationship.

=== Information sharing ===
Information sharing is the extent to which a firm shares a variety of relevant, accurate, complete, and confidential ideas, plans, and procedures with its supply chain partners in a timely manner.

=== Joint decision making ===
Joint decision making refers to the process where supply chain partners orchestrate decisions in supply chain planning and operations that optimize supply chain benefits.

=== Joint knowledge creation ===
Joint knowledge creation is the extent to which supply chain partners develop a better understanding of and response to the market and competitive environment by working together.

=== Resource sharing ===
Resource sharing is the process of leveraging capabilities and assets and investing in capabilities and assets with supply chain partners.
