= Human Security Report Project =

Peace and conflict studies research group

The Human Security Report Project (HSRP) is a peace and conflict studies research group. The Project is presently based at Simon Fraser University's School for International Studies at Harbour Centre in Vancouver, British Columbia, Canada, having formerly been based at the University of British Columbia's Liu Institute for Global Issues in the Human Security Centre.

Human Security Report Project (HSRP)

== Publications and services ==
The Project is known primarily for the Human Security Report 2005, which provided evidence that, according to the Project's data and definitions, there had been a large decline in the number of wars, genocides, and international crises since the end of the Cold War. The reduction in armed conflict in recent history has been referred to as the Long Peace, and there is general agreement among experts that the frequency of war has declined since at least the 1950s, despite a widespread misperception that the world has become more dangerous.

Subsequently, the Project published the Human Security Brief 2006, updating the core global trend data from the 2005 Report, and the Human Security Brief 2007. The 2007 Brief demonstrated that there had been a sharp decline in the incidence of terrorist violence (measured in terms of numbers of fatalities) around the world. If fatalities from political violence against civilians perpetrated by non-state groups in Iraq are counted as deaths from terrorism, the decline dated mid-2007. This claim was disputed in a press release from the University of Maryland's National Consortium for the Study of Terrorism and Responses to Terrorism (START). However, START at that time only had incident data to 2004. Subsequent START reports confirmed the large decline in fatalities from terrorism in 2007. One problem with the START project's dataset is that it counts politically motivated killings of civilians in civil war by non-state actors as terrorism in some contexts, but not in others. In Iraq, for example, such killings are counted as acts of terrorism, but the very large number of comparable killings in Sub-Saharan Africa's civil wars in the 1990s are not. Subsequent to the publication of the 2007 Brief, the incidence of global terrorism has again increased, with most of the increase being in Afghanistan and Pakistan. Further, the 2007 Brief suggested positive change in Sub-Saharan Africa's security landscape; the number of conflicts being waged in the region more than halved between 1999 and 2006.

In late October 2008, the Project published, in conjunction with the World Bank, the miniAtlas of Human Security. This publication was produced in three languages and is an "at-a-glance guide to global security issues", using a selection of maps and graphics to illustrate security trends, and is part of the World Bank's miniAtlas series. There have been subsequent translations of the miniAtlas into Russian, Japanese, and Arabic.

In 2010, the Project launched the Human Security Report 2009/2010 at the United Nations. Part I of the Report examines "The Causes of Peace" since the end of World War II. Part II examines "The Shrinking Costs of War", paying particular attention to "indirect deaths" from war-exacerbated disease and malnutrition. Part III reviews recent trends in organized violence around the world. A hard copy version of the Report was published by Oxford University Press early in 2011. The text of the Report is freely available online at www.hsrgroup.org.

In addition to its publications, the Project runs several free e-services available in a number of delivery formats:

- Human Security Gateway
- Human Security Research

== Funding and collaboration ==
The Project works closely with a number of the world's leading research groups in peace and conflict studies, including:

- The Peace Research Institute Oslo, based in Norway
- The Uppsala Conflict Data Program, based in Sweden

It has received funding from a number of governments, including:

- Canada's Department of Foreign Affairs and International Trade
- The United Kingdom's Department for International Development
- The Norwegian Ministry of Foreign Affairs
- The Swedish International Development Cooperation Agency
- The Swiss Federal Department of Foreign Affairs

The Project is a principal partner of the International Relations and Security Network.

== Criticism ==
Lack of robust conflict data remains a major problem with all attempts to track conflict numbers and fatality trends. The Uppsala Conflict Data Program's has an acknowledged tendency to undercount fatalities. However, the tendency to undercount does not obscure trends, and both researchers and policymakers who focus on the causes of war and peace are more concerned with trends (are the number of wars/battle deaths increasing or decreasing) than in absolute numbers. For truth and reconciliation commissions, the reverse is true. There are various methodologies that can be used to estimate war deaths: incident-based reporting like that undertaken by the Uppsala Conflict Data Program, nationwide retrospective mortality surveys like those undertaken in Iraq and the Democratic Republic of the Congo, and censuses. Each has strengths and weaknesses. Uppsala's methodology is, however, the only one that permits timely annual updates for all conflict-affected countries. There are ongoing debates on the validity of data compiling and counting methodology. Part III of the Human Security Report 2009/2010 contains a discussion of these debates.

== See also ==
- Human security
