= Political violence =

Violence conducted with political goals

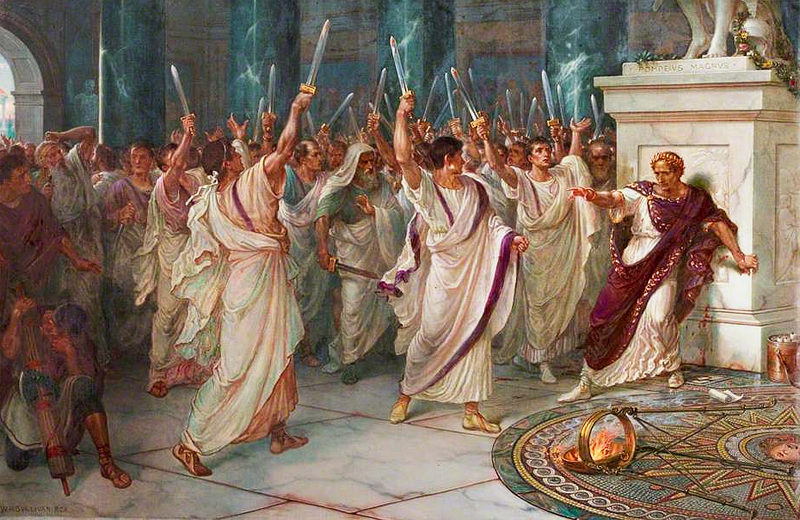
Painting of the assassination of Julius Caesar, painted by William Holmes Sullivan in 1888

Painting of the storming of the Bastille by revolutionary insurgents during the French Revolution in 1789, painted by Jean-Pierre Houël

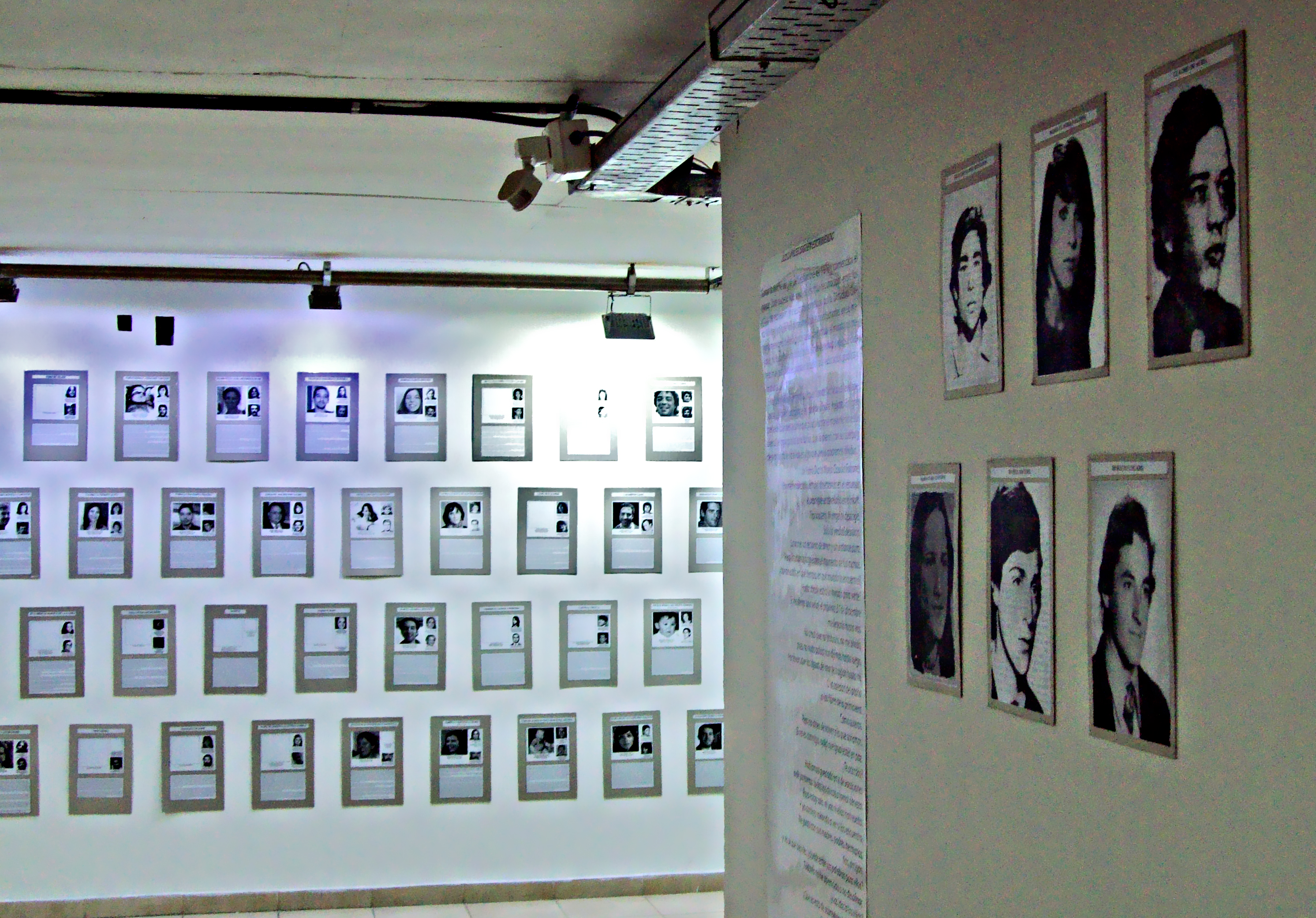
Photographs of victims of the Dirty War under the military dictatorship of Argentina (1976–1983), part of the U.S.-backed Operation Condor in Latin America

Political violence is violence that is perpetrated in order to achieve political goals. It can include violence which is used by a state against other states (war), violence which is used by a state against civilians and non-state actors (forced disappearance, psychological warfare, police brutality, targeted killings, torture, ethnic cleansing, or genocide), and violence which is used by violent non-state actors against states and civilians (kidnappings, assassinations, terrorist attacks, torture, psychological and/or guerrilla warfare). It can also describe politically motivated violence which is used by violent non-state actors against a state (rebellion, rioting, treason, or coup d'état) or it can describe violence which is used against other non-state actors and/or civilians. Non-action on the part of a government can also be characterized as a form of political violence, such as refusing to alleviate famine or otherwise denying resources to politically identifiable groups within their territory.

Due to the imbalances of power which exist between state and non-state actors, political violence often takes the form of asymmetric warfare where neither side is able to directly assault the other, instead relying on tactics such as guerrilla warfare and terrorism. It can often include attacks on civilian or otherwise non-combatant targets. People may be collectively targeted based on the perception that they are part of a social, ethnic, religious, or political group; or selectively, targeting specific individuals for actions that are perceived as challenging someone or aiding an opponent.

Many politically motivated militant, insurgent, extremist, and/or fundamentalist groups and individuals are convinced that the states and political systems under which they live will never respond to their demands, and they thus believe that the only way to overthrow and/or reshape the government or state accordingly to their political and/or religious worldview is through violent means, which they regard as not only justified but also necessary in order to achieve their political and/or religious objectives. Similarly, many governments around the world believe that they need to use violence in order to intimidate their populaces into acquiescence. At other times, governments use force in order to defend their countries from outside invasions or other threats of force and coerce other governments or conquer territory.

== Types ==
Political violence varies widely in form, severity, and practice. In political science, a common organizing framework is to consider the types of violence which are used by the relevant actors: violence between non-state actors, one-sided violence which is perpetrated by a state actor against civilians, and violence between states.

Stathis Kalyvas identifies eleven types of political violence: Interstate war, Civil war, Terrorism, Political assassination, Military coup, Mass protest/Rebellion, Intercommunal violence, Organized crime/Cartels, Ethnic cleansing, Genocide, and State repression.

=== Violence by non-state actors ===
==== Violent non-state actor ====
Violent non-state actors and paramilitaries have attacked politicians or political demonstrations, for example Baltagiya (Egypt), Pancasila Youth (Indonesia), Colectivo (Venezuela), Rubbish Collection Organization (Thailand), Titushky (Ukraine, Georgia), "thugs-for-hire" (China). Some of these groups are suspected to be connected to the state.

==== Ethnic conflicts ====
An ethnic conflict is fought between ethnic groups. While at times a specific ethnic group may have the backing (whether formal or informal) of the state (or conversely, a specific ethnic group may be targeted by the state), an ethnic conflict can also take place between two groups without the direct intervention of the state, or despite the state's attempts to conduct mediation between groups.

==== Terrorism ====
Terrorism can be directed by non-state actors against political targets other than the state (e.g. Stabbing attacks at gay pride parades in Jerusalem, Charlie Hebdo shooting). Because terrorism is a tactic often used by the weaker side of a conflict, it may also fall under violence between a state and non-state actor.

While there lacks a concrete definition of terrorism, the United States Department of Defense however defines terrorism as, "the calculated use of unlawful violence or threat of unlawful violence to inculcate fear; intended to coerce or to intimidate governments or societies in the pursuit of goals that are generally political, religious, or ideological." What is and is not considered terrorism is itself a controversial political question, as states have often used the label of terrorism to exclusively demonize the actions of their enemies while obscuring "legal" violence administered by the state (e.g. The Troubles, communist rebellion in the Philippines, 2014 Israel–Gaza conflict).

=== One-sided violence by the state ===
The use of force by an organized armed group connected to government, which results in the deaths of civilians is considered one-sided. According to the Human Security Report Project, one-sided violence by governments is recorded whenever violence against civilians committed by one group results in at least 25 reported deaths in a calendar year.

==== Genocide ====
One form of political violence is genocide. Genocide is commonly defined as "the deliberate and systematic destruction, in whole or in part, of an ethnic, racial, religious, or national group", although what constitutes enough of a "part" to qualify as genocide has been subject to much debate by legal scholars. Genocide is typically carried out with either the overt or covert support of the governments of those countries where genocidal activities take place. The Holocaust is the most cited historical example of genocide.

==== Torture ====
Torture is the act of inflicting severe pain (whether physical or psychological) as a means of punishment, revenge, forcing information or confession, or simply as an act of cruelty. Torture is prohibited under international law and the domestic laws of most countries in the 21st century. It is considered a human rights violation and is declared unacceptable by Article 5 of the Universal Declaration of Human Rights. Signatories of the Third Geneva Convention and Fourth Geneva Convention have officially agreed not to torture prisoners in armed conflicts. National and international legal prohibitions on torture derive from a consensus that torture and similar ill-treatment are immoral, as well as impractical. Despite international conventions, torture cases continue to arise such as the 2004 Abu Ghraib torture and prisoner abuse scandal committed by military police personnel of the United States Army. Organizations such as Amnesty International and the International Rehabilitation Council for Torture Victims monitor abuses of human rights and reports widespread violations of human torture by states in many regions of the world. Amnesty International estimates that at least 81 world governments currently practice torture, some of them openly.

==== Capital punishment ====
Capital punishment is the sentence of death upon a person by the state as a punishment for an offense. This does not include extrajudicial killing, which is the killing of a person by governmental authorities without the sanction of any judicial proceeding or legal process. The use of capital punishment by country varies, but according to Amnesty International 58 countries still actively use the death penalty, and in 2010, 23 countries carried out executions and 67 imposed death sentences. Methods of execution in 2010 included beheading, electrocution, hanging, lethal injection and shooting.

==== Famine ====
Famine can be initiated or prolonged in order to deny resources, compel obedience, or to depopulate a region with a recalcitrant or untrusted populace.

==== Police brutality ====
Police brutality is another form of political violence. It is most commonly described in juxtaposition with the term excessive force. Police brutality can be defined as "a civil rights violation that occurs when a police officer acts with excessive force by using an amount of force with regards to a civilian that is more than necessary". Police brutality and the use of excessive force are present throughout the world and in the United States alone, 4,861 incidents of police misconduct were reported during 2010. Of these, there were 6,826 victims involved and 247 fatalities.

=== Violence between a state and a non-state actor ===
At least one of the warring parties involved is the government of a state.

==== Rebellion ====
Rebellion is an uprising that resists and is organized against one's government. A rebel is a person who engages in a rebellion. A rebel group is a consciously coordinated group that seeks to gain political control over an entire state or a portion of a state. A rebellion is often caused by political, religious, or social grievances that originate from a perceived inequality or marginalization. Rebellion comes from Latin re and bellum, and in Lockian philosophy refers to the responsibility of the people to overthrow unjust government.

==== Rioting ====
A riot can be described as a violent disturbance by a group of individuals formed to protest perceived wrongs and/or injustice. These can range from poverty and inequality to unemployment and government oppression. They can manifest themselves in a number of ways but most commonly in the form of property damage. Riots are characterized by their lack of predictability and the anonymity of their participants. Both make it difficult for authorities to identify those participating.

Riots have been analyzed in a number of ways but most recently in the context of the frustration-aggression model theory, expressing that the aggression seen in most riots is a direct result of a groups frustration with a particular aspect of their lives. Widespread and prolonged rioting can lead to and/or produce rebellion or revolution. There are also a number of different types of riots including but not limited to police riots, race riot, prison riots, and sport riot.

==== Revolution ====
In political science, a revolution is a fundamental and relatively sudden change in political power and political organization which occurs when the population revolts against the government, typically due to perceived oppression (political, social, economic) or political incompetence.

In a revolution political violence is usually common. The use of political violence is usually to fulfill a revolutionary objective, and in times of civil strife to challenge the status quo. The goals of political violence can be varied such as to strengthen the position of a group, or to weaken an opposing side.

==== Civil war ====
A civil war, also known as an intrastate war, is a war fought within the same state or country between organized groups. Less commonly, it can also be fought between two countries that have been created from one previously unified state. Often these conflicts involve one group wishing to take control of a region or expressing dissatisfaction with the government. There is typically a desire to overthrow the existing power or at least change some of their policies. In many cases, an outside power may intervene on behalf of one side if they share their ideology or condemn the methods/motives of their opponents.

==== Counter-insurgency ====
Counter-insurgency, another form of political violence, describes a spectrum of actions taken by the recognized government of a state to contain or quell an insurgency taken up against it. There are many different doctrines, theories, and tactics espoused regarding counter-insurgency that aim to protect the authority of the government and to reduce or eliminate the supplanting authority of the insurgents. Because it may be difficult or impossible to distinguish between an insurgent, a supporter of an insurgency who is a non-combatant, and entirely uninvolved members of the population, counter-insurgency operations have often rested on a confused, relativistic, or otherwise situational distinction between insurgents and non-combatants. Counter-insurgency operations are common during war, occupation and armed rebellions.

==== Electoral violence ====
Electoral violence includes any acts or threats of coercion, intimidation, or physical harm perpetrated to affect an electoral process or that arise in the context of electoral competition. It is used to influence the outcome of elections; to delay, disrupt or derail polls; and to protest election results or suppress protests against election results. Electoral violence is used to influence the outcome of elections because parties cannot win through fraud alone and because candidates cannot rely on fraud agents to perpetrate fraud for them because fraud is hidden and violence is not.

=== War between states ===
War is a state of organized, armed, and often prolonged conflict carried on between states, nations, or other parties typified by extreme aggression, social disruption, and usually high mortality. War should be understood as an actual, intentional and widespread armed conflict between political communities, and therefore is defined as a form of political violence. Three of the ten most costly wars, in terms of loss of life, have been waged in the last century: the death toll of World War II, estimated at more than 60 million, surpasses all other war death tolls by a factor of two. It is estimated that 378,000 people died due to war each year between 1985 and 1994.

== Trends ==
Considerable scholarship and data has suggested that violence has declined since World War II. Based on battle deaths, one of the most frequently used measures of the Intensity of armed conflict, there was a decline in conflict from 1946 to 2013. Another indicator, the number of civil conflicts, has gradually declined since the Cold War ended.

However, more recent scholarship questions the conclusion that violence is decreasing world-wide, based on the measures used and the statistical basis for such interpretations. In addition indicators show a rise in violence in the 2010s, heavily driven by conflicts involving transnational jihadist groups in the Middle East. The numbers of active conflicts in 2016 and 2019 were the highest recorded.

=== Long-run trends ===
Following World War II, there was a decline in worldwide battle deaths. Since 1946, battle death rates have not matched World War II levels. However, there have been oscillations, with sizable peaks in deaths corresponding the Korean War, the Vietnam War, and the Iran–Iraq War and Soviet–Afghan War. Longer term statistical analysis suggests that this pattern is not unusual given the variability involved in a long-term datasets of historical wars, and that conclusions of a downward trend are premature.

The Center for Systemic Peace reports that armed conflict in the post-World War II era was at its peak when the Soviet Union collapsed. Following the Cold War, from the 1990s to the early 2000s, there was a decline in this measure of conflict. Between 1992 and 2005, violent conflict around the world dropped by 40 percent.

Other datasets on political violence have shown similar trends. The Uppsala Conflict Data Program (UCDP), another project that collects armed conflict data, defines armed conflict as conflict that involves the government of a state which "results in at least 25 battle-related deaths in one calendar year." In their overview of data on armed conflict, UCDP also found that the number of armed conflicts in the world decreased following the end of the Cold War.

In The Better Angels of Our Nature (2011), Steven Pinker argued that this decline has not occurred over the past 60 years, but has been going on for over the past millennia.

However, more recent upward trends show that armed conflict is increasing as political violence in the Middle East and Africa increases. In the past ten years, the UCDP has found an upward trend in the number of internationalized armed conflicts, "a conflict between a government of a state and internal opposition groups with intervention from other states."

==== Critique ====
Some scholars argue that data focusing on the number of battle deaths per country per year are misleading.

Tanisha Fazal argues that wars have become less fatal because of medical advancements that help keep more people alive during wars. Therefore, the battle death threshold used by the UCDP and other organizations to determine cases of armed conflict is misleading. A conflict "that produced 1,000 battle deaths in 1820 will likely produce many fewer overall casualties (where casualties, properly understood, include the dead and wounded) than a conflict with 1,000 battle deaths today." The current data makes it seem like war is becoming less frequent, when it is not.

Bear F. Braumoeller argues that looking at data on per-capita death is a "misleading and irrelevant statistic" because it does not tell us how wars actually happen. A decrease in battle-related deaths can mean that population growth is outpacing war deaths or that "fewer people are exposed to risk of death from war". Instead, we should examine the willingness of a state to go to war. Braumoeller creates a new metric for conflicted called the "use of force", which is the number of militarized disputes that reach at least a level 4 on the 5-point Correlates of War Militarized Interstate Dispute scale. He finds that use of force has held steady from the 1800s through the First World War, but after World War I the use of force has steadily increased.

Braumoeller creates another metric called "uses of force per relevant dyad", which is the use of force between neighboring states or states with one major power. Using this metric he finds that there is no downward trend in the rates of conflict initiation since the post-World War II period. Additionally, he finds that the rates of conflict have remained steady over the past two hundred years and the slight increases and decreases in use of force are random.

=== Current trends ===
==== Armed conflicts ====
Based on data from the UCDP, there were 221 intrastate armed conflicts in the period from 1946 to 2019, involving more than 100 countries worldwide. While there has been a general decline in fatalities from such conflicts, the number of active conflicts in 2019 matched its highest record from 2016. In 2019, UCDP recorded 54 state-based conflicts, 28 of which involved transnational jihadist groups. This compares to 40 active armed conflicts in 2014. The three countries with the highest total fatalities in the 1989–2019 period were Rwanda, Syria and Afghanistan, with Afghanistan accounting for 40% of all fatalities worldwide in 2019.

As of 2014, regionally, Asia had the largest number of violent conflicts at 14, followed by Africa at 12, Europe at six, Middle East at six, and the Americas at two. In 2014, four new conflicts began, all of them in Ukraine. Three conflicts were restarted by new actors in Egypt, Lebanon, and Libya. Additionally, six conflicts were restarted by previously registered actors in "Azerbaijan (Nagorno-Karabakh), India (Garoland), India–Pakistan, Israel (Palestine), Mali (Azawad), and Myanmar (Kokang)". Finally, seven conflicts in 2013 were no longer active in 2014. The conflicts were in Central African Republic, Ethiopia (Oromiya), Malaysia (Sabah), Myanmar (Karen), Myanmar (Shan), Mozambique, and Turkey (Kurdistan).

Out of the 40 conflicts in 2014, 11 have been classified at the level of war, which means that there were at least 1,000 deaths in one calendar year. The conflict between India and Pakistan was the only interstate conflict, conflict between two or more states. Out of the remaining 39 conflicts, 13 were internationalized, a conflict between a government and internal opposition group where other states intervene. The percentage of internationalized conflict is 33% (13/39), which is the largest proportion of external actors in intrastate conflicts since the post-World War II era.

==== Terrorism ====
Just like the number of casualties which were associated with armed conflicts, there was an increase in the number of fatalities which were associated with terrorism. In 2014, the United States State Department reported 13,463 terrorist attacks in the world. These attacks resulted in at least 32,700 deaths and 34,700 injuries. In addition, more than 9,400 people were kidnapped or taken hostage. Compared to 2013, the number of terrorist attacks increased by 35% and the total fatalities increased by 81%.

In 2014, the five countries that experienced the most terrorist attacks were Iraq, Pakistan, Afghanistan, India, and Nigeria. In 2013, Iraq, Pakistan, Afghanistan, India, and the Philippines were the countries that experienced the most terrorist attacks.

In 2013 and 2014, the perpetrators responsible for the most terrorist attacks were ISIS, the Taliban, al-Shabaab, Boko Haram, and Maoists. Fifty-five percent of the targets were either private citizens, private property, or police. 66% of attacks in Nigeria and 41% of attacks in Iraq targeted private citizens and property.

The Global Terrorism Database estimates that that between 2004 and 2013, about 50% of all terrorist attacks, and 60% of fatalities due to terrorist attacks, took place in Iraq, Afghanistan and Pakistan.

==== Polling ====
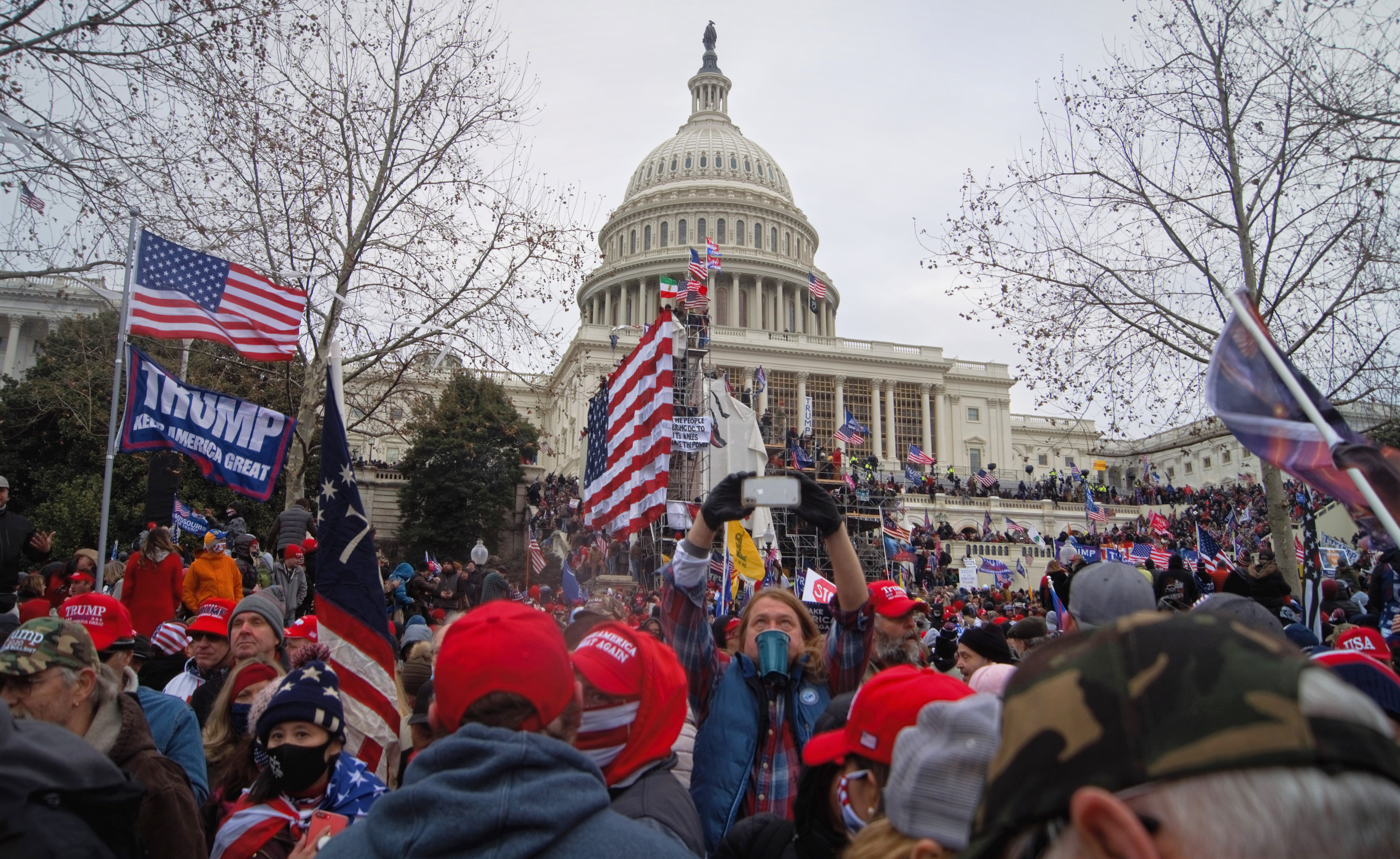
Protestors storming the US capital building

A 2023 PRRI poll found that 23% of those surveyed in 2023 believed that "American patriots may have to resort to political violence to save our country" in 2024, up from 15% of those surveyed in 2021.

== Theories ==
Theories of political violence can be organized by their level of analysis:

- Macro theories explain how political, economic, and social processes cause political violence
- Micro theories discuss political violence processes that involve individuals and households, like who participates in violence and what motivates people to participate

Some research does not fit clearly into this dichotomy.

=== Macro ===
==== Democracy ====
More democracy can reduce political violence.

==== Social conflict theory ====
Social conflict theory is a Marxist-based social theory which states that social systems reflect the vested interests of those who own and control resources. The people in power use the political and economic institutions to exploit groups with less power. This causes the rest of society to become alienated or psychologically separated from the people in power. Revolutions occur to break down the social and economic separation between the people in power and the exploited people and "to achieve equity and social unity".

==== War's inefficiency puzzle ====
War's inefficiency puzzle explains why states go to war even though war is costly. In James Fearon's Rationalist Explanations for War, he asserts war is costly and that creates an incentive to bargain with the other side. However, states do not bargain and instead go to war because of private information on the capability to fight and the incentives to misrepresent this information.

==== Functionalism ====
Functionalism sees society as "an organism whose entire system has to be in good working order for systemic equilibrium to be maintained." However, when there is a shock to the system, society becomes disorientated allowing for collective violence.

==== Mass society ====
Mass society argues that violent social movements come from people who are isolated socially and from political institutions. People who are alienated are easily convinced to join radical or extremist movements.

==== Resource mobilization ====
Resource mobilization is a theory on social movement that emphasizes the capacity of competing groups to organize and use adequate resources to achieve their goals. The resources can be time, money, organizational skills, and certain social or political opportunities. Political violence occurs when individuals are able to mobilize sufficient resources to take action.

==== Primordialism ====
Primordialism is an explanation of ethnic violence and ethnic conflict. "Interethnic differences based on racial, language, religious, regional characteristics, and other visible markers produce interethnic conflicts because members of that same group emotionally identify with their in-group, but feel no such identity with those outside their ethnic group."

==== Instrumentalist ====
Instrumentalism is an explanation of ethnic violence and ethnic conflict. Ethnicity is not inherent in human nature. Conflict occurs when leaders manipulate ethnicity for the sake of political power or economic gain.

==== Constructivist ====
Constructivist is an explanation of ethnic violence and ethnic conflict. Ethnic and national identities are socially constructed and are formed through social, economic and political processes, like colonization and conquest. Ethnic conflict is a product of the factors shaping ethnic identity and not from ethnicity itself.

==== Youth bulge ====
A youth bulge occurs when there is disproportionate percentage of a state population being between the ages of 15 and 24 years old. It occurs when infant mortality rates decrease and fertility rate increase. This youth bulge increases the working-age population; however, it does not translate to more jobs being available, which leads to severe unemployment. This will cause the young adult male population to "prolong dependency on parents, diminish self-esteem and fuel frustrations". This leads the youth to "seek social and economic advancement by alternative, extralegal means", which means that the opportunity costs to join armed movements are low.

=== Micro ===
==== Rational choice theory ====
Rational choice theory is a decision-making approach in which the decisions makers compare the expected utility of competing options and select the option that produces the most favorable outcome. Political violence occurs when the benefits in participating in political violence outweighs the costs.

==== Relative deprivation ====
In Why Men Rebel, Ted Robert Gurr uses relative deprivation theory to explain why men commit acts of violence. As Gurr explains, relative deprivation "is defined as actors' perception of discrepancy between their value expectations and their value capabilities." In other words, relative deprivation is the gap between the wants and needs people feel they deserve versus what they are capable of "getting and keeping." The collective discontent, the gap between the expected and achieved welfare, leads people to resort to violence.

==== Collective action theory ====
Collective action theory explains why people participate in rebellions. A person decides to participate or not participate in a rebellion based on the benefits and costs. Generally, people decide to be free riders and not to participate in the rebellion. These people will still receive the benefits of the rebellion since the benefits are a public good. However, if people are expected to receive private goods, like material rewards or power, then that person is expected to rebel.

==== Greed versus grievance ====
Greed versus grievance provides two lines of explanations as to why individuals will fight. Individuals are said to be motivated by greed when they decide to join a conflict in an effort to better their situation and find that benefits of joining a rebellion or any kind of collective violence is greater than not joining. Individuals are said to be motivated by grievance when they fight over "high inequality, a lack of political rights or ethnic and religious divisions in society." In "Greed and Grievance in Civil War", Paul Collier and Anke Hoeffler argue that greed is a better predictor of participating in violence than grievance.

== Effects ==
In the aftermath of political violence, there are many changes that occur within the state, society, and the individual.

=== Macro ===
Social science literature that examines how political violence affects the region, state, nation, and society.

==== State-building ====
Charles Tilly argues that "war making", eliminating rivals outside a territory, "state making", eliminating rivals within a territory, "protection", protecting subjects within a territory, and "extraction", extracting resources to "[carry] out the first three activities", tend to depend on the state's monopoly on violence.

A study found incitement or tolerance of political violence was associated with democratic backsliding.

=== Micro ===
There are a growing number of social science studies that examine how political violence affects individuals and households. It is important to keep in mind that what happens at the individual and household level can affect what happens at the macro level. For example, political violence effects an individual's income, health, and education attainment, but these individual consequences combined can effect a state or nation's economic growth. In other words, the macro and micro consequences of political violence do not occur in a vacuum.

==== Political impacts ====
There are empirical studies that link violence with increases in political participation. One natural experiment examines the effect of being abducted by Joseph Kony's LRA on political participation. An abducted male Ugandan youth, or in other words a former child soldier, had a greater probability of voting for Uganda's 2005 referendum and being a community mobilizer/leader than a male Ugandan youth who was not abducted.

However, this effect is not just contained to Uganda. Another natural experiment on the effects of the Sierra Leone civil war found that victimized households, household whose members were killed, injured, maimed, captured, or made refugees, were more likely to register to vote, attend community meetings, and participate in local political and community groups than households that did not experience violence.

==== Economic impacts ====
A study on the effects of the Sierra Leone civil war found that victimized households, household whose members were killed, injured, maimed, captured, or displaced, did not have long-term impacts on owning assets, child nutrition, consumption expenditures and earnings.

== Datasets ==
Datasets enable studying the causes of political violence.

=== Armed Conflict Location and Event Data Project (ACLED) ===
The Armed Conflict Location and Event Data Project (ACLED) is a project that collates data on political violence and protest in developing countries, from 1997 to the present. As of early 2016, ACLED has recorded over 100,000 individual events, with ongoing data collection focused on Africa and ten countries in South and Southeast Asia. The data can be used for medium- and long-term analysis and mapping of political violence across developing countries through use of historical data from 1997, as well as informing humanitarian and development work in crisis and conflict-affected contexts through real time data updates and reports.

ACLED defines "political violence" as "the use of force by a group with a political purpose or motivation." The database uses this definition to catalog a number of what it refers to as political events across Africa and Southeast Asia. Political events are described as "a single altercation where often force is used by one or more groups for a political end. The data project catalogs nine different types of events.

=== Human Security Report Project (HSRP) ===
The Human Security Report Project (HSRP) catalogs global and regional trends in organized violence, their causes and consequences. Research findings and analyses are published in the Human Security Report, Human Security Brief series, and the miniAtlas of Human Security based in Vancouver, Canada.

Using data from the Uppsala Conflict Data Program, the report tracks 5 types of violence:

- State-based armed conflict is cataloged as international conflicts and civil wars—in which at least one of the warring parties is the government of a state.
- Interstate Conflicts are conflicts between two states.
- Intrastate Conflicts happen within a state such as a civil war.
- Non-state armed conflicts are conflicts which consist of fighting between two armed groups, neither of which is the government of a state
- One-sided violence is thought of as targeted attacks against unarmed civilians.

== Prevention ==
Prevention of political violence includes counterterrorism, countering violent extremism, deradicalization, condemnation of political violence, and other crime prevention approaches.

== See also ==
- Category:Assassinated politicians by nationality
- False imprisonment – Illegal restraint of a person in a bounded area without justification or consent
- Legislative violence – Violence in legislative bodies
- List of attacks on diplomatic missions
- List of attacks on high courts
- List of attacks on legislatures
- List of heads of state and government who were assassinated or executed
- Political censorship – Censorship of political opinions
- Political cleansing of population – Eliminating groups of people for political reasons
- Political repression – Act of state entity involving restriction on the political freedom of citizens
- Political violence in the United States
- Wrongful detention – Detention without evidence or likelihood of crime, or without due process
