= Supply chain network =

Evolution of the basic supply chain

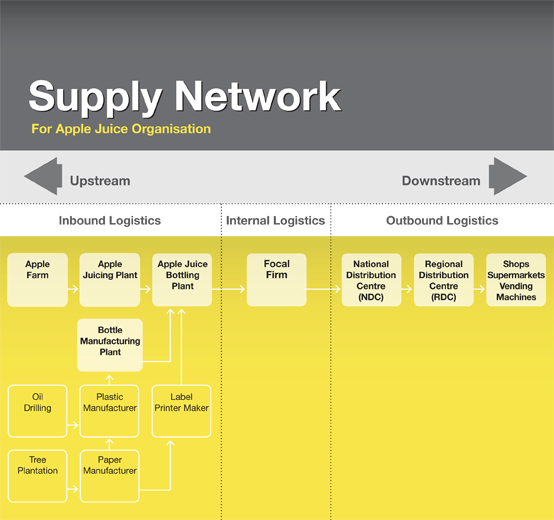
Example of a supply-chain network

A supply-chain network (SCN) is an evolution of the basic supply chain. Due to rapid technological advancement, organizations with a basic supply chain can develop this chain into a more complex structure involving a higher level of interdependence and connectivity between more organizations, this constitutes a supply-chain network.

A supply-chain network can be used to highlight interactions between organizations as well as to show the flow of information and materials across organizations. Supply-chain networks are now more global than ever and are typically structured with five key areas: external suppliers, production centers, distribution centers (DCs), demand zones, and transportation assets.

== Overview ==
Supply-chain network management may involve several types of information systems including Order Management Systems, Warehouse Management System, Transportation Management Systems, Strategic Logistics Modeling, Inventory Management Systems, Replenishment Systems, Supply Chain Visibility, and Optimization Tools. Emerging technologies and standards such as the RFID and the GS1 Global Standards can support the identification and tracking of goods throughout the Supply Chain Networks in a real time manner. Supply‑chain‑visibility platforms track raw‑material sourcing, production processes, inventory levels, shipment status and delivery schedules.

== Supply-Chain Network Design ==
A supply-chain network can be strategically designed in such a way as to reduce the cost of the supply chain; it has been suggested by experts that 80% of supply chain costs are determined by location of facilities and the flow of product between the facilities. Supply chain network design is sometimes referred to as 'Network Modelling', due to the fact a mathematical model can be created to optimize the supply-chain network.

Companies have been led to modify their basic supply chain, investing in the tools and resources to develop an improved SCN design that takes into account taxation regulations, new entrants into their industry and availability of resources, has resulted in more complex network designs.

Designing a SCN involves creating a network that incorporates all the facilities, means of production, products, and transportation assets owned by the organization or those not owned by the organization but which immediately support the supply-chain operations and product flow. The design should also include details of the number and location of facilities: plants, warehouses, and supplier base. Therefore, it can be said that a SCN design is the combination of nodes with capability and capacity, connected by lanes to help products move between facilities

There is no definitive way to design a SCN as the network footprint, the capability and capacity, and product flow—all intertwine and are interdependent. Following on from this, there is also no single optimal SCN design, in designing the network there is an apparent trade-off between responsiveness, risk tolerance and efficiency.

== Reverse Supply-Chain Network Design ==
A new requirement for 'reverse supply-chain network design' has arisen from the environmental impact of end-of-life goods. This particular network design addresses logistical issues such as collection, processing and recycling of end-of-life goods. Companies that design both forward and reverse supply-chain processes together, with recycling & disposal in mind, have been noted to have the greatest success. Through this, organizations can support goods from production to disposal creating a 'closed-loop system'.

=== Examples of reverse supply network design ===
Bosch is a company that capitalizes on this closed-loop system by building sensors into their power tool motor. Bosch can quickly assess the state of a motor reducing the cost of inspection and disposal, thereby increasing their profit margin on refurbished power tools.

== Supply-Chain-Network Risk Analysis ==
A key part of designing the supply-chain network is ensuring the network is versatile enough to cope with future uncertainties.

The uncertainties associated with supply-chain networks fall within two categories, Endogenous uncertainty and Exogenous uncertainty.

=== Endogenous uncertainty ===
An uncertainty can be categorized as 'endogenous' when the origin of the risk is within the supply-chain network itself, such as market volatility or technological turbulence.

=== Exogenous uncertainty ===
An uncertainty can be categorized as 'exogenous' when the origin of the risk is external to the supply-chain network. Exogenous uncertainties can be further categorized; ongoing risks such as economic volatility, can be described as a 'continuous risk'. 'Discrete' events refer to infrequent events that could disrupt the supply-chain process, such as natural disasters.

=== Risk management ===
By distinguishing between these types of uncertainty, an organization can decide the best approach to risk management. A company has a very limited ability to prevent exogenous uncertainty. The risk to the supply-chain network can be minimized by being well prepared for potential events. Endogenous uncertainty can be somewhat mitigated with precautions such as regular communication between an organization and supplier.

== See also ==
- Document automation
- Supply chain collaboration
