= Human Security Report 2005 =

The Human Security Report 2005 is a report outlining declining world trends of global violence from the early 1990s to 2003. The study reported major worldwide declines in the number of armed conflicts, genocides, military coups, and international crises, as well as in the number of battle-related deaths per armed conflict. Three years in the making and launched in 2005, the report was produced at the Human Security Centre at the University of British Columbia's Liu Institute for Global Issues by the Human Security Report Project (HSRP), which moved in May 2007 to join Simon Fraser University's School for International Studies. The Human Security Report covers similar ground to the long-running Peace and Conflict series.

According to the 2005 Report, the world saw a shift in global security after the end of the Cold War, with a 40% decrease in the number of armed conflicts being waged around the world since the early 1990s, and an 80% decrease of genocides between 1998 and 2001.

Some critics have questioned the relevance of this data, noting that conflict and violence are still significant obstacles for human development, worldwide security, and sustainable peace. For example, a recent Human Development Report from the United Nations Development Programme agrees that the number of conflicts has declined in the last decade, but claims that the wars of the past 15 years have exterminated a larger number of human lives. The Human Security Report argues that there is no evidence to support such a contention. The Report claims that the average number of battle-related deaths per conflict has declined from some 38,000 in 1950 to less than 500 in 2007. Individual fatality tolls may well be inaccurate; the trends, however, are indisputable. There are no accurate data on the (much larger) number of people who die from war-exacerbated disease and malnutrition, but the Report argues that there are good reasons for believing that these have declined as well.

Some critics have argued that there was too much focus on battle-related "direct" deaths in the Report. However, an entire section discusses the large number of "indirect" deaths caused by war-exacerbated malnutrition and disease. In some cases, the Report says, the ratio of indirect to direct deaths is higher than 10:1. The Report argues that conflict-driven disease and malnutrition are greater threats to human security than bombs and bullets. But it also argues that indirect deaths have declined over the past 15 years, along with battle-related deaths. Indirect deaths–the hidden cost of war–is one of the two main themes of the later Human Security Report 2009/2010.

Indirect deaths are driven by the intensity and scope of political violence. The 2009/2010 Report argues that, since humanitarian assistance has increased on a per capita basis and since recent peacetime health interventions–primarily immunization–reduce death tolls in wartime, it is highly likely that indirect deaths from war-exacerbated disease and malnutrition have declined to a greater degree than have "direct" deaths from violent injuries.

Since the 2005 Report appeared, the data on armed conflict trends, which comes from the Uppsala Conflict Data Program, indicates that there has been a 25% increase in the overall number of conflicts in which a state is one of the warring parties, but that the number of high-intensity conflicts (those generating 1,000 or more battle deaths in a year) have continued to decline and are now some 68% lower than at the end of the Cold War.
