= E-International Relations =

- Website type: Academic
- Available in: English
- Founded: 2007
- Country of origin: United Kingdom
- Area served: Global
- Editor: Stephen McGlinchey
- Website: www.e-ir.org
- Commercial: No
- Current status: Active

E-International Relations (E-IR) is an open-access website covering international relations and international politics. It provides an academic perspective on global events. Its editor-in-chief is Stephen McGlinchey. The website has published since November 2007, and was incorporated as a nonprofit organisation in 2011.

== Content ==
E-IR contains a mixture of open access books, articles, essays, and features, broadly aimed at students and scholars of international politics.

Prominent contributors have included Ted Robert Gurr, Harsh V. Pant, Charles J. Dunlap, Jr., Rohan Gunaratna, David R. Marples, Anand Menon, Barry Rubin, I. William Zartman, Immanuel Wallerstein, Jolyon Howorth, John Redwood, Brian Barder, Andrew Linklater, Filip Ivanović, Roie Yellinek and Stephen Chan.

== Reception ==
E-IR is listed under sites of related interest by the London School of Economics and is recommended by leading professors and diplomats. Its articles have been cited by The Wall Street Journal's blog, the Brookings Institution, the Stanley Foundation, and The Daily Beast. It is indexed by the Human Security Gateway.
