= Collective action theory =

Theory published by Mancur Olson in 1965

The collective action theory was first published by Mancur Olson in 1965. Olson argues that any group of individuals attempting to provide a public good has difficulty doing so efficiently. On the one hand individuals have incentives to "free-ride" on the efforts of others in certain groups and on the other hand the size of a group is of high importance and difficult to optimally determine.

== Basic theory of groups ==
=== Purpose of organizations ===
The primary function of an organization is the furtherance of common interests of groups of individuals. In general, an organization will fail if it does not further the common interest of its members. If such a common interest exists, any unorganized action by an individual will either fail in advancing the common interest at all or will not be able to advance the interest in a suitable way. However, each member of the organization has his or her own individual interests which differ from the interests of other members.

=== Public goods ===
Public goods bear common and collective benefits. Therefore, one of the basic goals of an organization is to provide its members with public goods. Public or “common” goods are freely accessible by each member of the group. Olson further defines public goods as any good that “cannot feasibly be withheld from other members of the group when one member of the group consumes the good”, even if those members did not contribute to the provision of that good. To provide an example, Olson assumes that the state's taxes were voluntarily paid by each citizen. In this case, it would not be feasible to prevent certain members who did not pay their taxes from activities like police protection, law and order or the state's defense.

Public goods can be further divided into inclusive public goods and exclusive public goods.

Inclusive public goods
A public good is called inclusive public good in nonmarket situations where the provision of the good expands when the group gets larger, thus also expands.
Exclusive public goods
A public good is called exclusive public good in market situations where the members attempt to reduce the size of their group as there is only a fixed and thus limited amount of gain from the good.

=== Traditional theory ===
Generally the traditional theory of groups does not take the size of groups into consideration. Hence, there is no distinction between large and small groups. Every group has the same basic character and is equally effective in fulfilling its function of advancing the main interests of its members. The traditional theory of groups can be divided into two basic variants which are briefly introduced in the following section.

==== Casual theory ====
This variant of the traditional theory says that private organizations and groups are ubiquitous because of a human affinity to form associations. According to this theory, such behavior can be explained by the human instinct to form herds to become stronger and more formidable when threatened by other herds.

==== Formal theory ====
In contrast to the casual variant, the formal theory is not based on any instincts of human beings. The focus of the formal variant lies on the “evolution of modern, industrial societies”. This evolution starts with family and other kinship groups which form the majority of groups under primitive circumstances. As society evolves secondary groups emerge which gradually absorb the social functions that had been provided by the kinship- and family-type units. Often these new groups reach a higher rate of interaction and importance than the primary groups. Examples for those secondary groups would be labor unions, large companies, states, churches or universities.

== Olson's theory of collective action ==
=== Difficulty of collective action ===
When each individual barely has influence on an organization's situation, but every individual is able to rejoice in every improvement regardless of whether he/she has contributed to it, a "conflict between collectively and individually best action" exists. Nobody is interested in bearing the expenses for the improvement, instead everyone is trying to profit from the public good in a greedy way.
Olson's theory explores the market failures where individual consumer rationality and firms' profit-seeking do not lead to efficient provision of the public goods, i. e. where another level of provision would provide a higher gain at lower expenses.
The basic problem consists of the fact that within the scope of Olson's model individuals, acting economically rational, do not have an interest in contributing to the provision of a public good. This is even the case if they themselves are able to utilize the good after it has been obtained.

=== Collective good provision ===
First of all some general remarks are made here concerning the provision of a good. The costs rise with an increasing output of public goods as well as of private goods. Moreover, there are fixed costs, this means that the first produced unit is the most expensive one. Furthermore, the difficulties in coordination and the transaction costs rise with the group size. Ergo, the average costs feature a U-shaped course. Lastly, every single individual's share of the overall profit depends on the quantity of individuals and on the individual utilization.

In the context of collective action the focus is on the provision of a collective good. The following applies for the optimal amount of a collective good to be obtained by an individual – if he/she obtains any:
$F_i * \frac{dV_g}{dT} = \frac{dC}{dT}$

This means that the optimal amount of a collective good is found when the rate of gain to the group, multiplied by the share of the group gain which the individual gets, equals the rate of increase of the total costs of the public good. Expressed in other words this means the optimal amount is reached when the rate of gain to the group exceeds the rate of increase in cost by the same coefficient that the group gain exceeds the gain to the individual as
$\frac{\frac{dV_g}{dT}}{\frac{dC}{dT}} = \frac{1}{F_i} = \frac{V_g}{V_i}$

More important than how much of a collective good is provided, is the question if the public good is provided at all. It becomes clear that, “at the optimum point for the individual acting independently” – described in the last paragraph – the collective good is provided if $F_i > \frac{C}{V_g}$, for if $F_i = \frac{V_i}{V_g}$, then $V_i > C$. So it can be seen that the gain to the individual exceeds the costs for providing the good. In other words, the total gain exceeds the total costs at least as much as the total gain exceeds the gain to the individual.

This analysis can i. e. be applied to a group of firms and the market theory about rivaling firms developed by Cournot can be seen as a special, more detailed case of this analysis.

=== Group size ===
In contrast to the traditional theory, the group size plays a decisive role in Olson's theory. Concerning the optimal group size it has to be stated that small groups possess a tendency toward suboptimal provision of public goods. But large groups often fail to provide themselves with a collective good at all. The smaller the single share of a member is the less is the optimality. This means that larger groups are less efficient. Moreover, it is important to consider not only the number of members of a group but also the size of each individual. The individual with the highest gain will most likely pay for the most part of the public good. “Normal” members will most likely not pay but nevertheless consume the public good, which is known as the so-called "free-riding", this can only be wiped out in groups which provide benefits only to active members. This results in the tendency of the exploitation of the great by the small. An optimum can only be reached, if the marginal costs are equally high as the marginal gain. There cannot be an over-optimality as in that case some individual had to have higher marginal costs than marginal gain and would cease the payment to provide the good, which would lead to a suboptimal provision of the public good.

In the end this leads to the conclusion that even though they tend to provide a suboptimal amount of a public good smaller groups are more efficient than larger ones which fail more likely to obtain even a minimal amount of a public good the larger they are.

=== Incentives for collective action ===
There are not only economic incentives – described in the previous paragraphs – for individuals to contribute to the provision of a public good. As so to say negative incentives to contribute there can e. g. be identified sanctions or social pressure. Furthermore, forced payments (taxes, etc.) are in some cases inevitable to finance public goods (e. g. law and order). But there are positive incentives as well. There might be some sort of social incentives in small groups with close contact (friendships within the group, the desire to gain prestige, etc.), which lead to an individual obtaining a public good. However, such altruistic behavior cannot be recognized in large groups. Moreover, some of the huge amount of incentives can be identified as so called selective incentives as they are able to mobilize a latent group and to differ between contributing and non-contributing individuals.

== Relevance for interorganizational systems ==
An interorganizational system (IOS) provides a basis to interchange information of all kinds between a minimum of two organizations, which expect many benefits from this system, subdivided in transactional, strategic and informational benefits. The above explained theory of collective action gives some important issues which have to be minded in operating an IOS in order to reduce free-riding and optimize the group's behavior:

1. Efficiency of the group: Olson mentioned several observations made in practice concerning the optimal size of groups. Small groups are more efficient than bigger groups, whereas small groups are defined as groups between four and seven members. This means for IOS not having too many participants, neither within a system nor in other parts of the organization (e. g. many persons in front of a terminal). Having in mind that especially larger organizations try to improve their performance by using IOS this insight should be remembered when it comes to group composition.
2. Incentives: Participants of various type of groups behave in different ways when incentives are used. Referring to the above chapter social incentives in a positive or negative way are only possible in smaller groups, where members are knowing each other. By using IOS it could be possible to uncover the members behavior leading to more social pressure even in larger groups. Anymore, in larger Interorganizational Systems financial aspects should be in mind to reward a member for conducing to the common welfare.
3. Public goods: Naturally it is not possible to control the exploitation of the public goods, but by the usage of IOS, primarily in form of an IT-system, a digital rights management (DRM) can be provided. With it access can be denied for some members to certain areas if they are not contributing their dues. Also it is possible to share the public good in a fair way by calculating members activities within the system for the common welfare.
