= Human security =

People-centric approach to national security

Human security is a paradigm for understanding global vulnerabilities whose proponents challenge the traditional notion of national security through military security by arguing that the proper referent for security should be at the human rather than the national level, and that a people-centered view of security is necessary for national, regional and global stability. The concept emerged from a multi-disciplinary understanding of security which involves a number of research fields, including development studies, international relations, strategic studies, and human rights. The United Nations Development Programme's 1994 Human Development Report is considered a milestone publication in the field of human security, with its argument that ensuring "freedom from want" and "freedom from fear" for all persons is the best path to tackle the problem of global insecurity.

Critics of the concept argue that its vagueness undermines its effectiveness, that it has become little more than a vehicle for activists wishing to promote certain causes, and that it does not help the research community understand what security means or help decision-makers to formulate good policies. Alternatively, other scholars have argued that the concept of human security should be broadened to encompass military security: 'In other words, if this thing called 'human security' has the concept of 'the human' embedded at the heart of it, then let us address the question of the human condition directly. Thus understood, human security would no longer be the vague amorphous add-on to harder-edged areas of security such as military security or state security.'

In order for human security to challenge global inequalities, there has to be cooperation between a country's foreign policy and its approach to global health. However, the interest of the state has continued to overshadow the interest of the people. For instance, Canada's foreign policy, "three Ds", has been criticized for emphasizing defense more than development.

== Origins ==
The emergence of the human security discourse was the product of a convergence of factors at the end of the Cold War. These challenged the dominance of the neorealist paradigm's focus on states, "mutually assured destruction" and military security and briefly enabled a broader concept of security to emerge. The increasingly rapid pace of globalization; the failure of liberal state-building through the instruments of the Washington Consensus; the reduced threat of nuclear war between the superpowers, and the exponential rise in the spread and consolidation of democratization and international human rights norms opened a space in which both 'development' and concepts of 'security' could be reconsidered.

At the same time, the increasing number of internal violent conflicts in Africa, Asia and Europe (Balkans) resulted in concepts of national and international security failing to reflect the challenges of the post Cold War security environment whilst the failure of neoliberal development models to generate growth, particularly in Africa, or to deal with the consequences of complex new threats (such as HIV and climate change) reinforced the sense that international institutions and states were not organized to address such problems in an integrated way.

The principal possible indicators of movement toward an individualized conception of security lie in the first place in the evolution of international society's consideration of rights of individuals in the face of potential threats from states. The most obvious foci of analysis here are the UN Charter, the UN Declaration of Human Rights (1948) and its associated covenants (1966), and conventions related to particular crimes (e.g., genocide) and the rights of particular groups (e.g., women, racial groups, and refugees).

== Concept ==
=== UNDP's 1994 definition ===
Mahbub ul Haq first drew global attention to the concept of human security in the United Nations Development Programme's 1994 Human Development Report and sought to influence the UN's 1995 World Summit on Social Development in Copenhagen. The UNDP's 1994 Human Development Report's definition of human security argues that the scope of global security should be expanded to include threats in seven areas:

Coloured world map indicating Human Development Index (as of 2008). Countries coloured green exhibit high human development, those coloured yellow/orange exhibit medium human development, and those coloured red exhibit low human development.

The 2003 map

- Economic security – Economic security requires an assured basic income for individuals, usually from productive and remunerative work or, as a last resort, from a publicly financed safety net. In this sense, only about a quarter of the world's people are presently economically secure. While the economic security problem may be more serious in developing countries, concern also arises in developed countries as well. Unemployment problems constitute an important factor underlying political tensions and ethnic violence.
- Food security – Food security requires that all people at all times have both physical and economic access to basic food. According to the United Nations, the overall availability of food is not a problem, rather the problem often is the poor distribution of food and a lack of purchasing power. In the past, food security problems have been dealt with at both national and global levels. However, their impacts are limited. According to the UN, the key is to tackle the problems relating to access to assets, work and assured income (related to economic security).
- Health security – Health security aims to guarantee a minimum protection from diseases and unhealthy lifestyles. In developing countries, the major causes of death traditionally were infectious and parasitic diseases, whereas in industrialized countries, the major killers were diseases of the circulatory system. Today, lifestyle-related chronic diseases are leading killers worldwide, with 80 percent of deaths from chronic diseases occurring in low- and middle-income countries. According to the United Nations, in both developing and industrial countries, threats to health security are usually greater for poor people in rural areas, particularly children. This is due to malnutrition and insufficient access to health services, clean water and other basic necessities.
- Environmental security – Environmental security aims to protect people from the short- and long-term ravages of nature, man-made threats in nature, and deterioration of the natural environment. In developing countries, lack of access to clean water resources is one of the greatest environmental threats. In industrial countries, one of the major threats is air pollution. Global warming, caused by the emission of greenhouse gases, is another environmental security issue.
- Personal security – Personal security aims to protect people from physical violence, whether from the state or external states, from violent individuals and sub-state actors, from domestic abuse, or from predatory adults. For many people, the greatest source of anxiety is crime, particularly violent crime.
- Community security – Community security aims to protect people from the loss of traditional relationships and values and from sectarian and ethnic violence. Traditional communities, particularly minority ethnic groups are often threatened. About half of the world's states have experienced some inter-ethnic strife. The United Nations declared 1993 the Year of Indigenous People to highlight the continuing vulnerability of the 300 million Aboriginal people in 70 countries as they face a widening spiral of violence.
- Political security – Political security is concerned with whether people live in a society that honors their basic human rights. According to a survey conducted by Amnesty International, political repression, systematic torture, ill-treatment, or disappearance was still practised in 110 countries. Human rights violations are most frequent during periods of political unrest. Along with repressing individuals and groups, governments may try to exercise control over ideas and information.

Since then, human security has been receiving more attention from key global development institutions, such as the World Bank. Tadjbakhsh, among others, traces the evolution of human security in international organizations, concluding that the concept has been manipulated and transformed considerably since 1994 to fit organizational interests.

=== Freedom from Fear vs Freedom from Want and beyond ===
In an ideal world, each of the UNDP's seven categories of threats (and perhaps others as a broader discussion might prioritize) would receive adequate global attention and resources. Yet attempts to implement this human security agenda have led to the emergence of two major schools of thought on how to best practice human security – '"Freedom from Fear"' and '"Freedom from Want"'. While the UNDP 1994 report originally argued that human security requires attention to both freedom from fear and freedom from want, divisions have gradually emerged over the proper scope of that protection (e.g. over what threats individuals should be protected from) and over the appropriate mechanisms for responding to these threats.

- Freedom from Fear – This school seeks to limit the practice of Human Security to protecting individuals from violent conflicts while recognizing that these violent threats are strongly associated with poverty, lack of state capacity and other forms of inequities. This approach argues that limiting the focus to violence is a realistic and manageable approach towards Human Security. Emergency assistance, conflict prevention and resolution, and peace-building are the main concerns of this approach. Canada, for example, was a critical player in the efforts to ban landmines and has incorporated the "Freedom from Fear" agenda as a primary component in its own foreign policy. However, whether such a “narrow” approach can truly serve its purpose in guaranteeing more fruitful results remains to be an issue. For instance, the conflicts in Darfur are often used in questioning the effectiveness of the "Responsibility to Protect”, a key component of the Freedom from Fear agenda.
- Freedom from Want – The school advocates a holistic approach in achieving human security and argues that the threat agenda should be broadened to include hunger, disease and natural disasters because they are inseparable concepts in addressing the root of human insecurity and they kill far more people than war, genocide and terrorism combined. Different from "Freedom from Fear", it expands the focus beyond violence with emphasis on development and security goals.

Despite their differences, these two approaches to human security can be considered complementary rather than contradictory. Expressions to this effect include:

- Franklin D. Roosevelt's famous Four Freedoms speech of 1941, in which "Freedom from Want" is characterized as the third and "Freedom from Fear" is the fourth such fundamental, universal, freedom.
- The Government of Japan considers Freedom from Fear and Freedom from Want to be equal in developing Japan's foreign policy. Moreover, the UNDP 1994 called for the world's attention to both agendas.
- Surin Pitsuwan, the Secretary-General of ASEAN in 2008-2012 cites theorists such as Hobbes, Locke, Rousseau and Hume to conclude that "human security is the primary purpose of organizing a state in the beginning.". He goes on to observe that the 1994 Human Development Report states that it is "reviving this concept" and suggests that the authors of the 1994 HDR may be alluding to Franklin Roosevelt's Four Freedoms speech without literally citing that presentation.

Although "freedom from fear" and "freedom from want" are the most commonly referred to categories of human security practice, an increasing number of alternative ideas continue to emerge on how to best practice human security. Among them:

- Paul James. James asks two apparently simple questions: Firstly, why, if 'the human’ as a category by definition encompasses all considerations of governance, the state and the military, does military security continue to be treated as prior, more significant, or even equal to human security. By contrast, "when children play ‘category’ games", he says, "they implicitly understand such issues of ordering". Secondly, why does human security get narrowly defined in terms of liberal notions of 'freedom': freedom from want and freedom from fear? In response to these two questions, he provides the following alternative definition, with human security encompassing military security:

Human security can be defined as one of the foundational conditions of being human, including both (1) the sustainable protection and provision of the material conditions for meeting the embodied needs of people, and (2) the protection of the variable existential conditions for maintaining a dignified life. Within this definition, it then makes sense that the core focus of human-security endeavours should be on the most vulnerable. It makes sense that risk management should be most responsive to immediate events or processes that have both an extensive and intensive impact in producing material and existential vulnerabilities of people in general or a category of persons across a particular locale.

- G. King and C. Murray. King and Murray try to narrow down the human security definition to one's "expectation of years of life without experiencing the state of generalized poverty". In their definition, the "generalized poverty" means "falling below critical thresholds in any domain of well-being"; and it is in the same article, they give a brief review and categories of "Domains of Well-being". This set of definitions is similar to "freedom from want" but more concretely focused on some value system.
- Caroline Thomas. She regards human security as describing "a condition of existence" which entails basic material needs, human dignity, including meaningful participation in the life of the community, and an active and substantive notion of democracy from the local to the global.
- Roland Paris. He argues that many ways to define "human security" are related to a certain set of values and lose the neutral position. So he suggests to take human security as a category of research. As such, he gives a 2*2 matrix to illustrate the security studies field.

Security for Whom?	What is the Source of the Security Threat?	
	Military	Military, Non-military, or Both
States	National security (conventional realist approach to security studies)	Redefined security (e.g., environmental and economic [cooperative or comprehensive] security)
Societies, Groups, and Individuals	Intrastate security (e.g., civil war, ethnic conflict, and democide)	Human security (e.g., environmental and economic threats to the survival of societies, groups, and individuals)

- Sabina Alkire. Different with those approaches seek to narrow down and specify the objective of human security, Sabina Alkire pushes the idea a step further as "to safeguard the vital core of all human lives from critical pervasive threats, without impeding long-term human fulfilment". In a concept as such, she suggests the "vital core" cover a minimal or basic or fundamental set of functions related to survival, livelihood and dignity; and all institutions should at least and necessarily protect the core from any intervention.
- Lyal S. Sunga. In 2009, Professor Sunga argued that a concept of human security that is fully informed by international human rights law, international humanitarian law, international criminal law and international refugee law, and which takes into account the relevant international legal norms prohibiting the use of force in international relations, will likely prove more valuable to international legal theory and practice over the longer term, than a concept of human security which does not meet these conditions because these fields of law represent the objectified political will of States rather than the more subjective biases of scholars.

The first university textbook of human security, edited by Alexander Lautensach and Sabina Lautensach, appeared in open access form in 2020. According to their Four Pillar Model, human security rests on the four pillars of sociopolitical security, economic security, environmental security and health security. Because of its focus on the long term as well as on immediate needs, the environmental pillar of human security assumes prime significance. It necessitates our attention to the utter dependence of human welfare on the integrity of ecological support structures.

=== Relationship with traditional security ===
Coined in the early 1990s, the term human security has been used by thinkers who have sought to shift the discourse on security away from its traditional state-centered orientation to the protection and advancement of individuals within societies. Human security emerged as a challenge to ideas of traditional security, but human and traditional or national security are not mutually exclusive concepts. It has been argued that, without human security, traditional state security cannot be attained and vice versa.

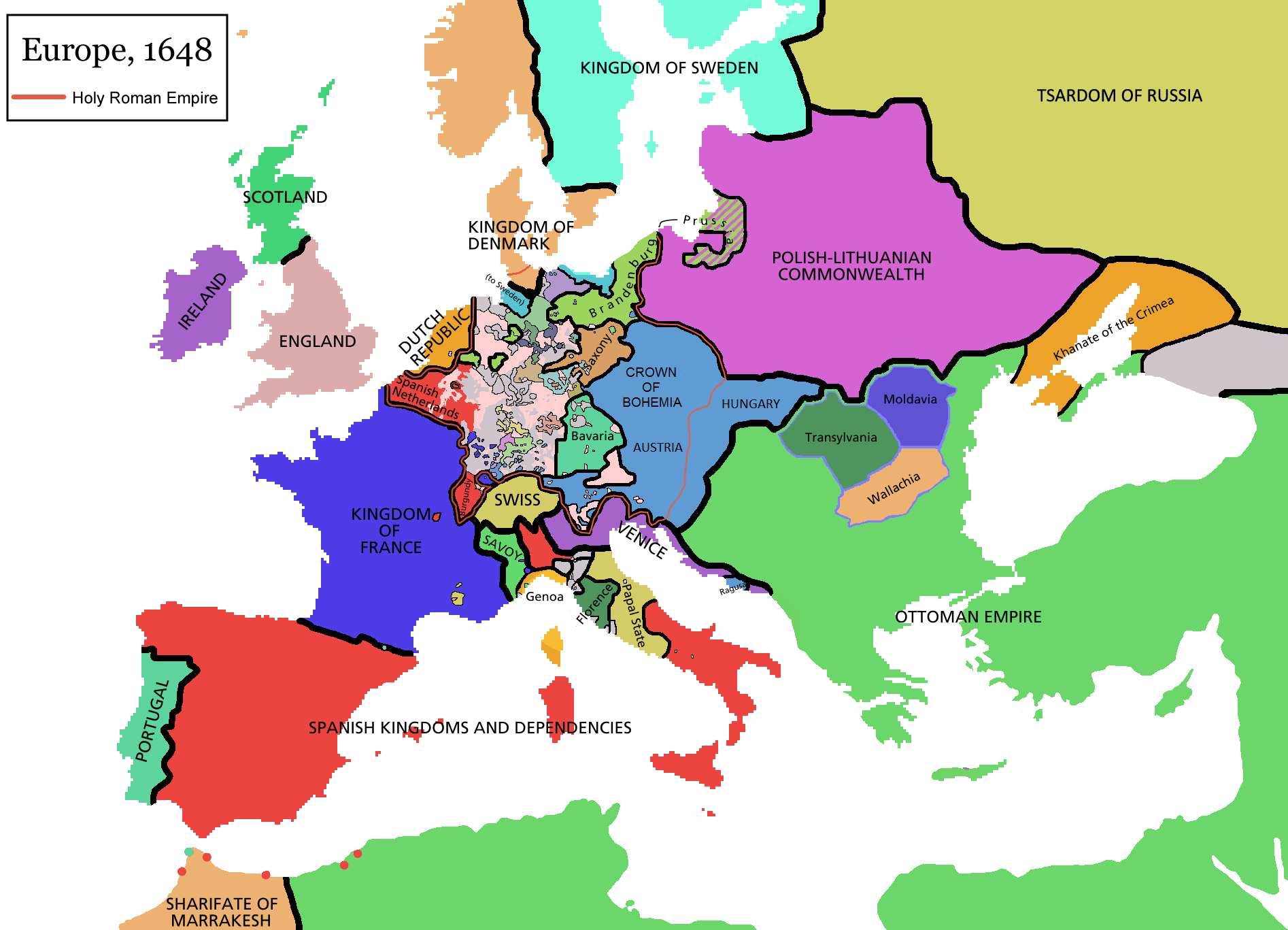
Europe after the Peace of Westphalia in 1648

Traditional security is about a state's ability to defend itself against external threats. Traditional security (often referred to as national security or state security) describes the philosophy of international security predominance since the Peace of Westphalia in 1648 and the rise of the nation-states. While international relations theory includes many variants of traditional security, from realism to liberalism, the fundamental trait that these schools share is their focus on the primacy of the nation-state.

The following table contrasts four differences between the two perspectives:

	Traditional Security	Human Security
Referent	Traditional security policies are designed to promote demands ascribed to the state. Other interests are subordinated to those of the state. Traditional security protects a state's boundaries, people, institutions and values.	Human security is people-centered. Its focus shifts to protecting individuals. The important dimensions are to entail the well-being of individuals and respond to ordinary people's needs in dealing with sources of threats.
Scope	Traditional security seeks to defend states from external aggression. Walter Lippmann explained that state security is about a state's ability to deter or defeat an attack. It makes use of deterrence strategies to maintain the integrity of the state and protect the territory from external threats.	In addition to protecting the state from external aggression, human security would expand the scope of protection to include a broader range of threats, including environmental pollution, infectious diseases, and economic deprivation.
Actor(s)	The state is the sole actor. Decision-making power is centralized in the government. Traditional security assumes that a sovereign state is operating in an anarchical international environment, in which there is no world governing body to enforce international rules of conduct.	The realization of human security involves not only governments, but a broader participation of different actors, viz. regional and international organizations, non-governmental organizations and local communities.
Means	Traditional security relies upon building up national power and military defense. The common forms it takes are armament races, alliances, strategic boundaries, etc.	Human security not only protects but also empowers people and societies as a means of security. People contribute by identifying and implementing solutions to insecurity.

=== Relationship with development ===
Human security also challenged and drew from the practice of international development.

Traditionally, embracing liberal market economics was considered to be the universal path for economic growth, and thus development for all humanity. Yet, continuing conflict and human rights abuses following the end of the Cold War and the fact that two-thirds of the global population seemed to have gained little from the economic gains of globalization, led to fundamental questions about the way development was practiced. Accordingly, human development has emerged in the 1990s to challenge the dominant paradigm of liberal economy in the development community. Human development proponents argue that economic growth is insufficient to expand people's choices or capabilities, areas such as health, education, technology, the environment, and employment should not be neglected.

Human security could be said to further enlarge the scope for examining the causes and consequences of underdevelopment, by seeking to bridge the divide between development and security. Too often, militaries didn't address or factor in the underlying causes of violence and insecurity while development workers often underplayed the vulnerability of development models to violent conflict. Human security springs from a growing consensus that these two fields need to be more fully integrated in order to enhance security for all.

The paper "Development and Security" by Frances Stewart argues that security and development are deeply interconnected.

- Human security forms an important part of people’s well-being, and is therefore an objective of development.
  An objective of development is “the enlargement of human choices”. Insecurity cuts life short and thwarts the use of human potential, thereby affecting the reaching of this objective.
- Lack of human security has adverse consequences on economic growth, and therefore development.
  Some development costs are obvious. For example, in wars, people who join the army or flee can no longer work productively. Also, destroying infrastructure reduces the productive capacity of the economy.
- Imbalanced development that involves horizontal inequalities is an important source of conflict.
  Therefore, vicious cycles of lack of development which leads to conflict, then to lack of development, can readily emerge. Likewise, virtuous cycles are possible, with high levels of security leading to development, which further promotes security in return.

Further, it could also be said that the practice of human development and human security share three fundamental elements:

- First, human security and human development are both people-centered. They challenge the orthodox approach to security and development i.e. state security and liberal economic growth respectively. Both emphasize people are to be the ultimate ends but not means. Both treat humans as agents and should be empowered to participate in the course.
- Second, both perspectives are multidimensional. Both address people's dignity as well as their material and physical concerns.
- Third, both schools of thought consider poverty and inequality as the root causes of individual vulnerability.

Despite these similarities, the relationship with development is one of the most contested areas of human security. "Freedom from fear" advocates, such as Andrew Mack, argue that human security should focus on the achievable goals of decreasing individual vulnerability to violent conflict, rather than broadly defined goals of economic and social development. Others, such as Tadjbakhsh and Chenoy, argue that human development and human security are inextricably linked since progress in one enhances the chances of progress in another while failure in one increases the risk of failure of another.

The following table is adopted from Tadjbakhsh to help clarify the relationship between these two concepts.

Variables	Human Development	Human Security
Values	Well-being.	Security, stability, sustainability of development gains
Orientation	Moves forward, is progressive and aggregate: “Together we rise”	Looks at who was left behind at the individual level: “Divided we fall”
Time Frame	Long term	Combines short-term measures to deal with risks with long-term prevention efforts.
General objectives	Growth with equity. Expanding the choices and opportunities of people to lead lives they value.	“Insuring” downturns with security. Identification of risks, prevention to avoid them through dealing with root causes, preparation to mitigate them, and cushioning when disaster strikes.
Policy goals	Empowerment, sustainability, equity and productivity.	Protection and promotion of human survival (freedom from fear), daily life (freedom from want), and the avoidance of indignities (life of dignity).

=== Relationship with human rights ===
Human security is indebted to the human rights tradition (the ideas of natural law and natural rights). The development of the human security model can be seen to have drawn upon ideas and concepts fundamental to the human rights tradition. Both approaches use the individual as the main referent and both argue that a wide range of issues (i.e. civil rights, cultural identity, access to education and healthcare) are fundamental to human dignity. A major difference between the two models is in their approach to addressing threats to human dignity and survival. Whilst the human rights framework takes a legalistic approach, the human security framework, by utilizing a diverse range of actors, adopts flexible and issue-specific approaches, which can operate at local, national or international levels.

The nature of the relationship between human security and human rights is contested among human security advocates. Some human security advocates argue that the goal of human security should be to build upon and strengthen the existing global human rights legal framework. However, other advocates view the human rights legal framework as part of the global insecurity problem and believe that a human security approach should propel us to move above and beyond this legalistic approach to get at the underlying sources of inequality and violence which are the root causes of insecurity in today's world.

=== Relationship with non-governmental organizations ===
See also: Non-governmental organization

The term NGO (Non-Government Organisation) cannot be simply defined due to complexities surrounding its structure, environment and complex relations it shares with its internal factions; being its organisational mission, membership and sources of funding, and external factors such as the relationship it shares with actors; detailing the economic, political and societal constructs they may be bound by. A generic understanding of the term may refer to the actions taken in the interests of independent, voluntary contributors which exist independently from governments and corporations, designed to represent and provide a collective voice to individuals regarding issues. These issues cover contributions to the fields and industries of human development, health and nutrition, human rights and education, and environmental concerns; all of which influence and affect human security.

The traditional roles of NGOs may be classified into three components, in accordance with Lewis:

- Implementer: refers to the mobilisation of resources in order to aid the provision of goods and services, such as the act of service delivery.

- Catalyst: refers to the emotional and psychological aspect of the NGOs ability to inspire, facilitate or contribute to spur action or thinking.

- Partner: refers to the NGOs relationships shared with external actors such as governments, donors or the private sector players through joint activities, or projects with communities, with the purpose to strengthen the relationship between the NGOs and these partners in a mutually beneficial fashion.

The expansion of these roles have culminated in assisting the creation of a society where NGOs serve as important players in the global arena in regards to maintaining human security. Due to this increasing influence and the emergence of growing natural and man-made disasters, NGOs now are contracted by governments in order to adequately respond to crises, as well as assist individual or collectivised groups of citizens in lobbying their interests; thus culminating in the ability to enact, influence and change government agendas. However, NGOs are still largely dependent on certain levels of government funding, hence critics may argue that NGOs pose the ability to potentially damage issues of human security due to this financial dependence. Despite these critiques, the focus, expertise and infrastructure developed by NGOs through their activities linked with human development and human rights allow them to make unique contributions to human security provision.

=== Relationship with the environment ===
Comprehensive human security attempts to unify environmental security together with social (societal) security. A great number of intertwined environmental and social components together create the framework for comprehensive human security under the assumption that neither of those two categories is attainable in the long run without synergy between the two. That is to say that the trends in environmental, resource, and population stresses are intensifying and will increasingly determine the quality of human life on our planet and as such are a large determining factor of our social security.

Arthur H. Westing posits that the two interdependent branches of comprehensive human security can be broken down into a series of subcomponents to better achieve optimal environmental and social security. Environmental security is composed of two subcomponents: (a) Rational resource utilization, that is resource use that “meets the needs of the present without compromising the ability of future generations to meet their own needs.” Social security can be simplified to components of (a) Established political safeguards, (b) Economic safeguards, (c) Personal safeguards, and (d) Military safeguards.

The International Institute for Sustainable Development (IISD) states that a major goal of comprehensive human security is to “transmit practical recommendations to policy-makers on how to strengthen human security through better environmental management and more effective natural resource governance.” The overreaching goal being a pervasive global mindset that recognizes the interdependent natures of the natural environment and our collective social security.

=== Gender and human security ===
Human security focuses on the serious neglect of gender concerns under the traditional security model. Traditional security's focus on external military threats to the state has meant that the majority of threats women face have been overlooked. It has recently been argued that these forms of violence are often overlooked because expressions of masculinity in contexts of war have become the norm. By focusing on the individual, the human security model aims to address the security concerns of both women and men equally. However, as of recent conflicts, it is believed that the majority of war casualties are civilians and that "such a conclusion has sometimes led to the assumptions that women are victimized by war to a greater extent than men, because the majority of adult civilians are women, and when the populations of civilian women and children are added together, they outnumber male combatants. Furthermore, in the post-war context women survivors generally outnumber men and so it is often said that women as a group bear a greater burden for post-war recovery". Women are often victims of violence and conflict: they form the majority of civilian deaths; the majority of refugees; and, are often the victims of cruel and degrading practices, such as rape. Women's security is also threatened by unequal access to resources, services and opportunities. The UN Special Rapporteur on Violence Against Women, as of 1995, suggested that the problem is not just a social one, but requires evaluation of the political institutions which uphold the unequal system of domination. Women's rights are neglected especially in the Middle East and Southeast Asian regions where customary practices are still prevalent. Although there are different opinions on the issue of customary practices, it infringes upon human security's notion that women and men are innated with equal human rights. Attempts to eradicate such violent customary practices require political and legal approaches where human security in relation to gender should be brought up as the main source of assertion. Such cruel customary practices as honor killing, burning brides and widows, child marriage are still in existence because of women's vulnerability in economic independence and security. Human security in relationship to gender tries to overthrow such traditional practices that are incompatible to the rights of women. Also, human security seeks to empower women, through education, participation and access, as gender equality is seen as a necessary precondition for peace, security and a prosperous society.

=== Feminist critiques of human security ===
==== Rape as a weapon of war theory ====
During times of conflict, certain varieties of masculinity come to be celebrated by the State, and these varieties of behaviors can influence how a population's combatants come to behave, or are expected to behave during crises. These behaviors range from acting aggressively and exemplifying hyper-masculine behaviors, to playing upon the rise of "nationalist or ethnic consciousness" to secure "political support for the cause and to undermine "the Other". Overtly militaristic societies have utilized rape and other sexually violent acts to further their gains within the context of war, but also by using such practices of violence as rewards to the (often male) combatants. This tactic undermines the enemy's morale, as they are seen as "unable to protect their women".

==== The category of human ====
Recent feminist critiques of Human Security often find difficulties with the concept and categorization of "Human". This categorization is made under the influence of certain value systems which are inherently exclusive by their nature. For instance, the liberal definition of "human" is: someone that is independent and capable of making decisions for themselves. This definition is problematic because it excludes persons who are not independent, such as persons with disabilities, from human security rights. If Human Security was to be entirely inclusive it would need to challenge the current definition of "human" on which it operates and acknowledge that different abilities also require rights.

==== Eurocentrism ====
The concept of human security has developed out of the precepts put forth by the United Nations, wherein there has been a critique of Human Security's focus on what is deemed acceptable behaviors. Human security perspectives view practices such as child marriage and female genital mutilation as a threat to human (more specifically female) security and well-being in the Global North, while it is more common that these events occur predominately in the Global Southern states. Thus it is seen by states with a traditional human security outlook, to see it as their duty to intervene and perpetuate this eurocentric ideal of what human security looks like, and what is best to protect the familiar concept of women. This can be seen as an infringement on the traditional practices found within some sovereign states of the Global South, and a threat to ways of life and processes of development.

=== Prevent, react, and rebuild ===
Human security seeks to address underlying causes and long-term implications of conflicts instead of simply reacting to problems, as the traditional security approach is often accused of doing. "The basic point of preventive efforts is, of course, to reduce, and hopefully eliminate, the need for intervention altogether," while an investment in rehabilitation or rebuilding seeks to ensure that former conflicts do not breed future violence. The concepts of prevention and rebuilding are clearly embraced as the “responsibility to prevent” and well elaborated in "The Responsibility to protect report of the International Commission on Intervention and State Sovereignty."

== Relationship with humanitarian action ==
In several senses there is a natural fit between human security concepts and humanitarian principles. The concern with the protection of people or individuals is a core humanitarian value as well as of human security. In this sense it shares human security's merging of development and security and the casting of the protection of life as the referent object.

Human security and humanitarian action also shared a similar process of evolution. The rise of the human security discourse in the 1990s paralleled an equally rapid expansion in humanitarian roles and a broadening in the objectives of humanitarianism that was labeled the ‘new humanitarianism’. Humanitarian assistance, once encompassing a narrow set of emergency-based life-saving interventions conducted by a small group of relatively independent actors, became ‘an organising principle for intervention in internal conflicts, a tool for peacebuilding and the starting point for addressing poverty, as well as a palliative in times of conflict and crisis.’ It also merged with development concerns such as the promotion of social justice and societal cohesion.

The human security discourse was also used as a tool to resist aid policies becoming hijacked by narrow security concerns. States, such as the Republic of Ireland, promoted the Human Security concept as a way to ensure a more balanced approach to security and development issues both nationally and within the EU.

Despite the sense of a natural fit between human security concepts and humanitarian principles, they have enjoyed a difficult relationship. Human security perspectives have the potential to interfere with the traditionally apolitical nature of humanitarianism in conflict situations, leading to a blurring of the boundaries between politico-military interventions and those designed primarily to reduce suffering. In another sense the emphasis on human security has legitimised the idea of armed international intervention as a "moral duty" if states are deemed incapable or unwilling to protect their citizens. Similarly, the adoption of 'holistic' security and development strategies within UN Integrated peacekeeping missions is viewed by some as having the potential to compromise humanitarian principles.

Authors such as White and Cliffe drew attention to the way in which the 'broadening of aid objectives from pure survival support towards rehabilitation, development and/ or peace-building' led to the 'dilution of commitment to core humanitarian principles'. Furthermore, many humanitarian organisations have sought to develop rights-based approaches to assistance strategies which challenge the apolitical approach of traditional humanitarianism. Rights-based approaches view poverty and vulnerability as rooted in power relations – specifically, the denial of power, which is itself related to the denial of human rights. Hence rights-based approaches to humanitarian action relate the achievement of security for marginalized people to the realization of their human rights and often to broader social change. Multimandate humanitarian organisations that seek more inclusive and participatory forms of citizenship and governance and the achievement of broader social rights outcomes, therefore, risk enmeshing apolitical humanitarian responses in advocacy programmes that push for broader social changes.

== Practice ==
While there are numerous examples of the human security approach in action, two notable global political events with direct ties to the human security agenda include the development of Responsibility to Protect (R2P) principles guiding humanitarian intervention and the passage of the Ottawa Treaty banning anti-personnel landmines.

=== Humanitarian intervention ===
The application of human security is highly relevant within the area of humanitarian intervention, as it focuses on addressing the deep-rooted and multi-factorial problems inherent in humanitarian crises, and offers more long-term resolutions. In general, the term humanitarian intervention generally applies to when a state uses force against another state in order to alleviate suffering in the latter state (See, humanitarian intervention).

Under the traditional security paradigm, humanitarian intervention is contentious. As discussed above, the traditional security paradigm places emphasis on the notion of states. Hence, the principles of state sovereignty and non-intervention that are paramount in the traditional security paradigm make it difficult to justify the intervention of other states in internal disputes. Through the development of clear principles based on the human security concept, there has been a step forward in the development of clear rules of when humanitarian intervention can occur and the obligations of states that intervene in the internal disputes of a state.

These principles on humanitarian intervention are the product of a debate pushed by United Nations Secretary General Kofi Annan. He posed a challenge to the international community to find a new approach to humanitarian intervention that responded to its inherent problems. In 2001, the International Commission on Intervention and State Sovereignty (ICISS) produced the "Responsibility to protect", a comprehensive report detailing how the “right of humanitarian intervention” could be exercised. It was considered a triumph for the human security approach as it emphasized and gathered much needed attention to some of its main principles:

- The protection of individual welfare is more important than the state. If the security of individuals is threatened internally by the state or externally by other states, state authority can be overridden.
- Addressing the root causes of humanitarian crises (e.g. economic, political or social instability) is a more effective way to solve problems and protect the long-term security of individuals.
- Prevention is the best solution. A collective understanding of the deeper social issues along with a desire to work together is necessary to prevent humanitarian crises, thereby preventing a widespread absence of human security within a population (which may mean investing more in development projects).

The report illustrates the usefulness of the human security approach, particularly its ability to examine the cause of conflicts that explain and justify humanitarian intervention. In addition, it could also act as a paradigm for identifying, prioritizing and resolving large transnational problems, one of the fundamental factors that act as a stimulus for humanitarian intervention in the first place. However, human security still faces difficulties concerning the scope of its applicability, as large problems requiring humanitarian intervention usually are built up from an array of socio-political, cultural and economic problems that may be beyond the limitations of humanitarian projects. On the other hand, successful examples of the use of human security principles within interventions can be found.

The success of humanitarian intervention in international affairs is varied. As discussed above, humanitarian intervention is a contentious issue. Examples of humanitarian intervention illustrate, that in some cases intervention can lead to disastrous results, as in Srebrenica and Somalia. In other cases, a lack of clarity as to the rules of when intervention can occur has resulted in tragic inaction, as was witnessed during the Rwandan genocide. One example of a successful humanitarian intervention and also of humanitarian principles being applied is East Timor which, prior to its independence, was plagued with massive human rights abuses by pro-Indonesian militias and an insurgency war led by indigenous East Timorese against Indonesian forces. A peacekeeping mission was deployed to safeguard the move to independence and the UN established the United Nations Transitional Administration in East Timor (UNTAET). This not only dealt with traditional security priorities, but also helped in nation-building projects, coordinated humanitarian aid and civil rehabilitation, illustrating not only a successful humanitarian intervention but also an effective application of human security principles.

=== Anti-personnel landmines ===
State Parties to the Ottawa Treaty

In contrast to the traditional security discourse which sees security as focused on protecting state interests, human security proponents believe that Anti-personnel mines could not be viable weapons of war due to the massive collateral damage they cause, their indiscriminate nature and persistence after conflict. In particular, they argue that anti-personnel mines differ from most weapons, which have to be aimed and fired since they have the potential to kill and maim long after the warring parties have ceased fighting. The United Nations has reckoned that landmines are at least ten times more likely to kill or injure a civilian after a conflict than a combatant during hostilities. The effects are also long-lasting. The ICBL estimates that anti-personnel mines were the cause of 5,751 casualties in 2006. Whereas traditionally, states would justify these negative impacts of mines due to the advantage they give on the battlefield, under the human security lens, this is untenable as the wide-ranging post-conflict impact on the day-to-day experience of individuals outweighs the military advantage.

The Ottawa Convention, which led to the banning of anti-personnel landmines, is seen as a victory for the Human Security agenda. The Ottawa Convention has proved to be a huge step forward in the 'Freedom from Fear' approach. In Ottawa, the negotiations were moved outside traditional disarmament forums, thus avoiding the entrenched logic of traditional arms control measures. According to Don Hubert, an advocate of Human Security from the Canadian Department of Foreign Affairs, the main reason for its success was a multilateral focus. While INGO's like the UN and the ICRC remain the key players along with middle power states like Norway and Canada, its actual power and push comes from the involvement of a host of civil society actors (NGOs) and the general public. Human Security proponents believe that this treaty has set new standards in humanitarian advocacy and has acted as a landmark in international lawmaking for a more secure world.

Critics of the treaty, however, caution against complacency on its success. Many states, they point out, have neither signed nor ratified this convention. They include China, Russia and the United States who are major contributors to the global weapons trade. Second, even though there were a diverse group of civil society actors, the real influence on the treaty came from the ones in the 'global north'. Third, cynics may argue that the success of this campaign stems from the fact that these weapons were outdated and of limited military value and this treaty just helped to accelerate a process that would have happened anyway.

== Criticism ==
In making an assessment of the pros and cons of the human security concept, Walter Dorn includes several additional criticisms. In particular, he asks whether it is in fact as radical a departure in foreign policy terms as is sometimes claimed. Dorn argues that the international community has been concerned with issues of human safety since at least the time of the establishment of the International Committee of the Red Cross in the 1860s. Stuart Gordon argues that Canada, one of its principal adherents, has in many ways simply recast its traditional Pearsonian foreign policy in the language of human security. Dorn also questioned whether the concept was really necessary ‘since all the initiatives in the human security agenda were already advancing before the advent of the concept.’ Finally, he suggests ways that the concept may be counterproductive. In their effort to fortify against ‘virtually limitless UN interventionism’ governments may repress ‘their populations into servility." Still, he sees an important role for the concept.

Richard Jolly and Deepayan Basu Ray, in their UNDP report, suggest that the key criticisms of human security include: Human security does not have any definite boundaries, therefore anything and everything could be considered a risk to security. This makes the task of policy formulation nearly impossible; Human security, when broadened to include issues like climate change and health, complicates the international machinery for reaching decisions or taking action on the threats identified; Human security risks engaging the military in issues best tackled through non-military means; Human security under the UN risks raising hopes about the UN's capacity, which it cannot fulfil.

Other authors, such as Roland Paris, argue that human security is not such a fundamental recasting of the security debate in terms of a central struggle ‘between Realist, traditional, state-based, interest-based, approaches and new, Liberal cosmopolitan, de-territorialised, values-based approaches, which focus on individual human needs. ‘ Rather, he suggests that the talk of two radically different ‘paradigms’ has been much exaggerated.

== Formulation of a Human Security Index and an environment for discussing same ==
As if to answer the points above, a Human Security Index was prototyped and released in 2008. Project coordinator D. A. Hastings notes that "if one were challenged to create an index on the condition of people-centric Human Security, such as the authors of the Human Development Index faced in 1990 and expanded qualitatively in 1994, one could now begin to do so – at least for the sake of discussion and resultant improvements." The release document and a United Nations Bangkok Working Paper publish and discuss the original approach, which is based partly on:

- The original Human Development Index of the United Nations Development Programme, made more geographically complete (to 230+ countries) as described in a report issued by the United Nations Economic and Social Commission for Asia and the Pacific.
- The essay on Human Security in the 1994 Human Development Report.
- An Equitability/Inclusiveness Enhanced Human Development Index – in which each of the components of the HDI (education, health, and income) are modified by an indicator of equitability in an attempt to adjust, for example, for the gap between the indicator of Gross Domestic Product (GDP) Per Capita (adjusted for purchasing power parity) and the desired measure of financial resources "in the pocket" of a typical person in a country. In that index some countries with relatively equitable ratings compared to their Human Development Index (such as Iceland, the Slovak Republic, and Estonia) do relatively well, whereas some countries with relatively inequitable ratings compared to their HDI (such as Ireland, Greece, and the USA) do less well.
- A Social Fabric Index which enumerates human security with respect to the environment, diversity, peacefulness, freedom from corruption, and info empowerment. This was blended with the Human Development Index to form the prototype Human Security Index.

A 2010 enhancement to the HSI recast the composite index around a trinity of Economic, Environmental, and Social Fabric Indices. The result is thus conceptually similar to the Triple Bottom Line of Corporate Social Responsibility as described by John Elkington, as well as to the stated goals of the Commission on the Measurement of Economic Performance and Social Progress. The release note of HSI Version 2 also notes efforts to balance local and global context, individual and society concerns, left-right political issues, east-west and north-south cultural and social issues. Current Version 2 of the HSI ingests about 30 datasets and composite indicators, and covers 232 countries and dependencies. It is released at HumanSecurityIndex.org.

Considerable differences in national ratings and standings have been noted between the HSI and indicators such as GDP per capita or the Human Development Index. Several small island countries plus Bhutan, Botswana, and some central-eastern European countries do considerably better in the HSI than they do in GDP per capita or HDI. Conversely, Greece and some Eurozone peers such as Ireland and Spain, several countries in the Gulf, Israel, Equatorial Guinea, the US and Venezuela do worse in the HSI than in GDP per capita or HDI. Influential factors vary (as is viewed in the data and discussions on the HumanSecurityIndex.org Website), but include diversity and income equality, peacefulness, and governance.

== See also ==
- Arms Trade Treaty
- Civil defense
- Environmental racism
- Food security
- Gender and Security Sector Reform
- Global spread of H5N1
- Government
- Human development
- Human rights
- Human Security Report Project
- Human Security Report 2005
- Human trafficking
- Humanitarian crisis
- Humanitarian intervention
- International relations
- National security
- Non-governmental organization
- Poverty reduction
- Security of person
- Security sector reform
- Sexual slavery
- Social security
- Three generations of human rights
- Water crisis
- Asian Forum for Human Rights and Development
- International security
