= Ruth Sivard =

American economist

Ruth Leger Sivard
- Born: Ruth Lucille Leger; November 25, 1915; Elmhurst, New York, U.S.
- Died: August 21, 2015 (aged 99); Washington, D.C., U.S.
- Occupation: Economist
- Spouse: Robert Sivard
- Website: www.ruthsivard.com

Ruth Leger Sivard (November 25, 1915 – August 21, 2015) was an American economist. She worked at the Arms Control and Disarmament Agency from 1961 to 1971, drawing attention to excessive military budgets by compiling data on international defense spending.

== Early life and education ==
Ruth Lucille Leger was born in Elmhurst, Queens, to George and Susan (née Zieten) Leger on November 25, 1915. She attended Flushing High School, then earned a sociology degree from Smith College in 1937. Sivard obtained a master's degree in economics at New York University.

== Career ==
Sivard worked with several federal agencies and non-governmental organizations before joining the Arms Control and Disarmament Agency (ACDA) in 1961. She became the leader of ACDA's economic department three years later and began comparing military budgets to social statistics and other budgets in annual reports, including information on social indicators like infant mortality. Melvin Laird, Secretary of Defense, derided the reports as "misleading" and the agency was ordered by the Nixon administration to cease publishing the analyses in 1970.

Sivard left ACDA in 1971, and founded her own non-profit group, World Priorities. The organization, backed by the Carnegie Corporation, Ford Foundation, and Rockefeller Foundation, among others, published sixteen editions of World Military and Social Expenditures from 1974 to 1996. The government published its own annual report, World Military Expenditures and Arms Transfers, which did not make the comparison to social spending. Sivard reported in 1986 that the White House was one of the best customers for her report.

This set of work continued to focus on the steady increase in defense spending in spite of other, more serious problems also needing attention, such as worldwide poverty, famine, illiteracy, and unemployment.

== Personal ==
She was married to high school classmate Robert Sivard (1914–1990), the former art director of the United States Information Agency, with whom she had two children. She died of dementia in Washington, D.C., on August 21, 2015, aged 99.

== Bibliography ==
- World Military and Social Expenditures, 1974- ISSN 0363-4795
- Military Budgets and Social Needs: Setting World Priorities. New York: Public Affairs Committee, 1977. Public affairs pamphlet, no. 551
- World Energy Survey. Leesburg, Va., USA (Box 1003, Leesburg 22075: World Priorities, 1981
- Women; a world survey. Washington, DC, World Priorities, 1985. ISBN 9780918281005
- Women, a world survey. 2nd edition. Washington, DC. World Priorities, 1995. ISBN 9780918281104
