= Interorganizational system =

An interorganizational system (IOS) is a system between organizations, or "shared information system among a group of companies." The most common form of interorganizational system is electronic data interchange, which permits instantaneous computer-to-computer transfer of information.

== Overview ==
Interorganizational systems allow the flow of information to be automated between organizations in order to reach a desired supply-chain management system, which enables the development of competitive organizations. This supports forecasting client needs and the delivery of products and services.

Interorganizational system helps to better manage buyer-supplier relationships by encompassing the full depths of tasks associated with business processes company-wide. In doing these activities, an organization is able to increase the productivity automatically; therefore, optimizing communication within all levels of an organization as well as between the organization and the supplier. For example, each T-shirt that is sold in a retail store is automatically communicated to the supplier who will, in turn, ship more T-shirts to the retailer.

An Inter-organizational system is an information system shared by one or more suppliers and customers

Organizations might pursue an interorganizational system for the following reasons:

1. Reduce the risk in the organization
2. Pursue economies of scale
3. Benefit from the exchange of technologies
4. Increase competitiveness
5. Overcome investment barriers
6. Encourage global communication

An examples of interorganizational systems is the Sabre (computer system).

“ understanding of environmental uncertainty are leading to the horizontal relationships across organizations."
