= Liu Institute for Global Issues =

Research organization at the University of British Columbia

- Type: Public
- Affiliations: APRU; Universitas 21; ASAIHL; AUCC; IAU, CIS, CWUAA, CUSID, AUFSC, Corpus Christi College (Vancouver)
- Location: Vancouver, Kelowna & Great Northern Way Campus, British Columbia, Canada; 49°16′3″N 123°15′33″W
- Campus: Urban
- Website: sppga.ubc.ca/institutes-centres/liu-institute-for-global-issues/

The Liu Institute for Global Issues is a research organization at the University of British Columbia (UBC) in Vancouver, British Columbia, Canada. Founded by Professor Ivan Head in 1998, the institute officially opened in 2000. The institute is named after Jieh-jow Liou, a businessman, political figure and philanthropist, whose contributions through the Liu Foundation led to the research hub's creation. Its current focus is on issues related to global issues, development, environment, conflict (and post-conflict) and emerging forms of politics.

The Liu Institute conducts research and seminars on the UBC campus in Vancouver, British Columbia, Canada. Designed by Architectura in collaboration with architect Arthur Erickson, the Liu building sits at the edge of a second-growth forest. The structure's design incorporates a number of sustainable features aimed at maximizing use of recycled and salvaged materials, minimizing energy and water consumption, and reducing waste.
