= Non-combatant casualty value =

Military rule of engagement

2009 Joint Chiefs of Staff memo CJCSI 3160-01, which described the NCV

Non-combatant casualty value (NCV), also known as the non-combatant and civilian casualty cut-off value (NCV or NCCV), is a military rule of engagement which provides an estimate of the worth placed on the lives of non-combatants, i.e. civilians or non-military individuals within a conflict zone. It has become an element of strategic planning and policy-making during a number of armed conflicts, providing a quantification of the proportionality principle as interpreted by the military command, and thus influencing decisions regarding the use of force and "acceptable" collateral damage. It has been described as a "central value in contemporary Western war" and "perhaps our starkest rule of engagement".

The value is used as a threshold for delegated authority at the operational level; the threshold can be exceeded if the military commander is able to request and achieve sign-off from higher echelons within the military or political framework.

International law's historical prohibition against intentionally targeting civilians has been said to be poorly suited to modern warfare, due to its notion of "intent". This is because modern warfare techniques are able to predict likely civilian losses from any military action, such that it could be argued for any action where civilian losses are expected, that such civilian losses are "intended" even if considered "unavoidable".

NCV calculations are possible in modern warfare due to the availability of wider information sets and advanced weaponry with more accurate targeting, reducing collateral damage. The targeting process has been systematized and proceduralized, allowing for the rationalization of the killing of non-combatants.

== Valuation of lives ==
Acceptability of NCV levels vary depending on the type of target and military objective, or for a specific area of operations, mission, or weapon system. The two most significant factors are: the perceived value of the local civilians, and the perceived value of the target.

The value attributed to civilian lives depends on racial and geographic factors. Western forces operating in Western states, for example against a domestic terrorist attack, will use an NCV close to zero, in order to minimize casualties amongst their own citizens. Equivalent operations by Western forces in non-Western countries will use significantly higher NCVs.

Higher NCVs are considered acceptable for "high-value targets", i.e. strategically important targets such as enemy command centers or weapons facilities. Higher NCVs are usually considered unacceptable for civilian infrastructure, humanitarian sites, and densely populated areas where the risk of civilian casualties is greater.

Reported examples include:

- US forces in the Iraq War, high value target, initial phase of the war: NCV of 29-30
- US forces in the Iraq War, rank-and-file jihadist: NCV significantly lower
- US forces in Afghanistan: NCV of 1
- Israel forces in Gaza: NCV of 15 to 20 for junior Hamas operatives, up to 100 for senior operatives, 300 in one instance of a particularly senior operative, according to unnamed military sources.

NCVs are part of a military's rules of engagement. As rules of engagement and NCVs are normally classified, little or nothing is publicly known about the NCVs used by military forces other than the US and its allies. Such forces may use higher or infinite NCVs as they do not necessarily ascribe value to the lives of enemy civilians.

== Criticism ==
NCV has faced criticism for its subjective nature, potential for manipulation, discrepancies in its application across different conflicts, and possible contravention of international humanitarian law. Critics argue that assigning a numerical value to human life undermines the inherent dignity and rights of non-combatants, reducing them to mere statistics in military calculations. Moreover, the lack of standardized methodologies for determining NCV and the influence of political considerations raise concerns about its reliability and ethical implications.

According to Mathias Delori, in military assessments of moral actions the "actual number of deaths and injuries hardly counts... the 'way' in which violence is perpetrated matters more than the actual level of violence... it is the very act of calculation – the very fact that calculation took place – that justifies action... [and] although all lives matter in principle, some lives count more than others in practice".

== See also ==
- Non-combatant
- Distinction (law)
- Civilian casualties from U.S. drone strikes
- Civilian casualty ratio
- Loss exchange ratio
- Acceptable loss
- Intelligence, surveillance, target acquisition, and reconnaissance
- Legitimate military target
- Military necessity
- NAZA (film)

== Bibliography ==
- Delori, Mathias (2020-02-03). "The politics of emotions in contemporary wars". Handbook of Critical International Relations. Edward Elgar Publishing. pp. 305–323. doi:10.4337/9781788112895.00026. ISBN 978-1-78811-289-5.
- Adams, Major R. Scott (2017-08-08). "Lancelot in the Sky: Protecting Wounded Combatants from Incidental Harm". Harvard National Security Journal.
- Wolfe, Frank (2021-06-11). "Pentagon Removed Non-Combatant Casualty Cut-Off Value From Doctrine in 2018". Defense Daily.
