= Margaret Smith (orientalist) =

British writer and scholar

- Born: 1884; Southport, Lancashire, England
- Died: 23 February 1970 (aged 85–86)
- Known for: Scholarship on Islamic mysticism

Margaret Smith (1884– 23 February 1970) was a British orientalist specializing in comparative religion and Sufism.

== Biography ==
Margaret Smith was born in Southport, Lancashire to William Smith and Alice Ann Tullis, the sixth of seven daughters. Her family belonged to the Church of England, and Smith remained a religious Christian throughout her life. She obtained a teacher's diploma from Oxford in 1916 and taught in the Middle East until 1925. She obtained her doctorate from the University of London in 1928 where she studied with Reynold Alleyne Nicholson, Thomas Walker Arnold and Louis Massignon. Smith's dissertation became her seminal work on the early female Sufi mystic Rabi'a, titled Rabi‘a the Mystic and Her Fellow-Saints in Islam, one of the first English language biographies of Rabi'a. Smith was the first orientalist to focus her research on women Sufis.

From 1930 to 1932, she served as a lecturer on Islamic mysticism at the School of Oriental Studies. She then served as a research fellow at Girton College and a senior research student at Manchester College from 1936 to 1938. During World War II, she worked for the Wartime Social Survey, translating and writing texts for broadcasting in the Middle East and teaching Arabic to military personnel.

== Legacy ==
Smith's work on female Sufis influenced the German orientalist Annemarie Schimmel, who referenced her in her work on gender and Sufism, My Soul is a Woman. Smith succeeded in bringing attention to the overlooked role of women mystics in Islam, being referenced by future writers such as Schimmel and Sachiko Murata.

However, her work has been critiqued by modern scholars of Sufism. Atif Khalil and Shiraz Sheikh state that Smith saw Sufism as inauthentically Islamic and primarily derived from Christian mysticism.

== Works ==
In the 1970s four of Smith's works — by then hard to come by — were reprinted in Amsterdam, by Philo Press in arrangement with The Society for Promoting Christian Knowledge, London.

- Rabi'a the Mystic and Her Fellow-Saints in Islam. Being the life and teachings of Rabi'a al-'Adawiyya al-Qaysiyya of Basra, Sufi saint, ca A.H. 99-185, A.D.717-801. Together with an account of the place of the women in Islam and with a survey of sources, references, a concise bibliography and indexes, 1928
- An Introduction to the History of Mysticism: From the oldest elements of mysticism in the Old Testament and in Judaism through classical times and the Orient up to the nineteenth century, 1930
- Studies in Early Mysticism in the Near and Middle East. Being an account of the rise and development of Christian mysticism up to the seventh century, of the subsequent development in Islam, known as Sufism, and of the relationship between Christian and Islamic mysticism. With references, a bibliography and two indexes, 1931
- An Early Mystic of Baghdad: Al-Muhasibi, ca 781-875 A.D. Master of primitive Islamic mysticism and precursor of the great Muslim Mystics, 1935

Her work Rabi'a the Mystic was reprinted by Oneworld as Muslim Women Mystics: The Life and Work of Rabi'a and Other Women Mystics in Islam in 2001. Her book Studies in Early Mysticism in the Near and Middle East was also reprinted by Oneworld.

Her other works include:

- The Persian Mystics: 'Attar, 1932, E.P. Dutton and Company
- Readings from the mystics of Islam; translations from the Arabic and Persian, together with a short account of the history and doctrines of Sufism and brief biographical notes on each Sufi writer, 1950, Luzac and Company
- The Sufi Path of Love: An Anthology of Sufism, 1954, Luzac and Company
- Al-Ghazali: The Mystic: A Study of the Life and Personality of Abu Hamid Muhammad Tusi al-Ghazali, together with an account of his Mystical Teaching and an estimate of his place in the History of Islamic Mysticism, 1944

== See also ==
- Mysticism
- Sufi studies
