= Acceptable level of violence =

Phrase used in the Northern Ireland conflict

British Home Secretary Reginald Maudling's reference to an "acceptable level" of violence in the Northern Ireland conflict was a political gaffe that helped shape public discussion about the conflict.

Maudling said in a December 1971 press conference that the British government could not eliminate the Provisional Irish Republican Army's terrorist attacks but only reduce them to an "acceptable level". Critics maintained that any violence was unacceptable. Nevertheless, the concept influenced the British government's strategy in dealing with Northern Irish terrorism, and continues to be used in discussions of ongoing political violence in Northern Ireland.

== Origin ==
In a 15 December 1971 news conference, British Home Secretary Reginald Maudling commented on the escalation of violence as the Northern Ireland conflict was beginning. Maudling said, "I don't think one can speak of defeating the IRA [Provisional Irish Republican Army], of eliminating them completely, but it is the design of the security forces to reduce their level of violence to something like an acceptable level." It was the first time that the British government acknowledged that it did not have the power to eliminate Irish republican terrorism. According to historian Charles Townshend, this was "wholly unprecedented in public rhetoric".

At the time, Maudling's remark was widely regarded as a gaffe. His remarks were criticized in the Northern Ireland Parliament, with Ian Paisley saying that no level of violence was acceptable. Maudling was subsequently boycotted by Northern Irish opposition parties. Nevertheless, the idea of "acceptable level of violence" was "half accepted, half rejected", according to Townshend, who notes: "If terrorism cannot be eliminated, it must perforce at some level be tolerated—and it can be." The mindset influenced the British government's strategy for dealing with Northern Irish terrorism: to reduce the violence to the point that most people were not impacted as they went about their daily lives. According to Brewer's Dictionary of Irish Phrase & Fable, the idea of an acceptable level of violence amounted to "implicit toleration of death and destruction", even of terrorist attacks in Great Britain.

== Later uses ==
Unionist politicians subsequently developed their own interpretation, which was that there was an acceptable level of Ulster loyalist terrorism to counter the IRA.

American journalist P. J. O'Rourke suggests that in Northern Ireland, "acceptable level of violence" is similar to the air-quality index in American cities. He describes a week of "acceptable" violence in 1988, which included shootings, bombs, Molotov cocktails, and multiple paramilitary punishment attacks.

According to Colin Knox, defining what is an "acceptable level of violence" in post-ceasefire Northern Ireland, and what constitutes a violation of the ceasefire, "has caused considerable political controversy". Knox writes that ultimately the governments decides what is an acceptable level of violence by choosing to ignore the ongoing paramilitary punishment attacks. Knox disagrees, writing that "[m]utilations, torture, beatings and exiling" must not be considered acceptable.

According to a 2009 The Spectator article, although "no one is quite so indelicate as to employ the infamous phrase", the spirit of Maudling's remarks continues to be reflected in British policy. A 2018 article in The Irish Times suggested that the 158 people killed since the Good Friday Agreement were considered acceptable losses—although "no one wishes to use the term 'acceptable level of violence'"—because they come from working-class neighbourhoods. Also in 2018, an editorial in the Belfast Telegraph argued that the violence was no longer at an acceptable level due to expectations having been recalibrated since the agreement.

In a 2010 speech at Oxford, Hugh Orde, recently chief constable of the Police Service of Northern Ireland, discussed the threat of the dissident Irish republican campaign. Orde said that "To borrow a phrase from the past, we may be at an 'acceptable level of violence'—albeit at a far lower level than when the phrase was first coined" because dissident republicans were unlikely to respond to negotiation. Democratic Unionist Party MLA Jimmy Spratt called Orde's comments "outrageous" and an insult to those killed by dissident republicans. A Belfast Telegraph editorial described it as an unacceptable gaffe which "give[s] succour to terrorists" and argued that "for the vast majority of people there is no acceptable level of violence".

American political scientist Robert Goodin suggests that the idea of an acceptable risk is key to managing public risk perceptions of terrorism, which tends to be exaggerated. He notes that a 1978 survey found that 60 per cent of Americans considered the threat of terrorism "very serious" compared to 30 per cent of British people, even though there had been no terrorist deaths that year in the United States but 88 of them in the United Kingdom. According to Goodin, the perceived threat of terrorism can be more harmful than the actual level of terrorism, provided that the individual is not directly impacted by terror attacks.
