= Stephen Taylor, Baron Taylor =

British politician (1910–1988)

The Right Honourable The Lord Taylor

Member of the House of Lords Lord Temporal
- In office 7 August 1958 – 1 February 1988; Life Peerage

Member of Parliament for Barnet
- In office 26 July 1945 – 23 February 1950
- Preceded by: Constituency created
- Succeeded by: Reginald Maudling

Personal details
- Born: Stephen James Lake Taylor; 30 December 1910 High Wycombe; Buckinghamshire, England
- Died: 1 February 1988 (aged 77) Wrexham, Wales
- Party: Labour (Until 1981); SDP (1981–88)
- Occupation: Politician

Stephen James Lake Taylor, Baron Taylor (30 December 1910 – 1 February 1988), also known as S. J. L. Taylor, was a British physician, civil servant, politician and educator.

== Biography ==
Born in High Wycombe, Stephen was the son of John Taylor, a civil engineer, and his wife Beatrice (Lake) Taylor. Educated at Stowe School and then at St Thomas Hospital Medical School, London, where he qualified in 1934.

When war broke out he joined the RNVR as a neuropsychiatrist. But in 1941, the government transferred him to the Ministry of Information. He worked on a plan to publish information about health services to the public during wartime. From 1940 to 1944 he was Director of Home Intelligence and the Wartime Social Survey in the Ministry of Information. But by 1944 it appears he was already working for the Labour Party to achieve an electoral victory at the war's end. Elected as the Member of Parliament (MP) for Barnet in July 1945, he was appointed Parliamentary Private Secretary to the Deputy Prime Minister and Lord President of the Council from 1947. He was an expert policy advisor on the National Health Service. Taylor also served as a Governor and Vice-Chair of the British Film Institute while an MP.

In 1951, he was invited by the Nuffield Provincial Hospitals Trust to carry out a survey of general practice. He went on to make a significant contribution to the development of general practice, holding a number of positions on medical boards and other organisations, including two stints as a member of Harlow New Town Development Corporation. In 1955 he was appointed medical director to Harlow health Industrial Health Service for a period of nine years. But it appears was in such demand, that two years later resumed his role into retirement. Taylor was instrumental in the creation of Health Centres in Harlow. His model was rolled out to all major city centres across Britain, developing dental and nursing support within group practices. His survey of 1954 entitled Good General Practice was based on qualitative interviews at practices already identified as performing well by Joseph Collings report, General Practice in England : A Reconnaissance, (1950). NHS GP profession was still in its infancy, requiring much pioneering work to improve its services. Taylor sat on the Central Health Services Council, chaired by Sir Harry Cohen, the boss of Tesco. Local doctors had traditionally worked alone or in pairs, but the report resulted in group practice becoming the norm in Britain.

== House of Lords ==
On 8 August 1958, he was created a life peer by letters patent as Baron Taylor, of Harlow in the County of Essex on Gaitskell's recommendation.

In 1962, he mediated the end to the Saskatchewan doctors' strike in Saskatchewan, Canada. From 1964 he served the Labour government as Under-Secretary of State for Commonwealth Relations and Under-Secretary of State for the Colonies.

Lord Taylor objected to Labour's efforts to "abolish private medical practice, to prevent part-time medical work within the NHS and to abolish education...by destroying freedom of choice." He resigned from Labour Party in 1981 to sit with the Social Democratic Party.

Lord Taylor was also President and Vice-Chancellor of Memorial University of Newfoundland from 1967 to 1973. After he retired from this position he became visiting professor of community medicine at Memorial University of Newfoundland.

== Personal life ==
Taylor married Charity Clifford, a medical doctor and later Governor of Holloway Prison, in 1939. He died in Wrexham aged 77.

== Books ==
- 1949 Shadows in the Sun: the Story of the Fight Against Tropical Diseases (with Phyllis Gadsden)
- A Natural History of Everyday Life
- 1961 First Aid in the Factory and on the Building Site and Farm, in the Shop, Office and Warehouse
- 1964 Mental Health and Environment (with Sidney Chave)

Parliament of the United Kingdom
New constituency	Member of Parliament for Barnet; 1945–1950	Succeeded by Reginald Maudling
Political offices
Preceded by Richard Hornby; Nigel Fisher	Under-Secretary of State for the Colonies; 1964–1966; With: Eirene White (1964–1965); The Lord Beswick (1965–1966)	Succeeded by The Lord Beswick
Academic offices
Preceded by Moses Morgan (pro tempore)	President of Memorial University of Newfoundland; 1967–1973	Succeeded by Moses Morgan
Honorary titles
Preceded by The Lord Granville-West	Senior life peer 1984–1988	Succeeded by The Baroness Wootton of Abinger
