= Home Intelligence =

Home Intelligence was a division of the Ministry of Information (MOI) which was a government social research organisation responsible for monitoring civilian morale in Britain during the Second World War.

== Initial planning ==
The Ministry of Information understood that its success would rest on its ability to measure morale and had included plans for a ‘collecting division’ since July 1936. However these functions remained under-developed by pre-war planning and there were few means of gauging public opinion when the Second World War began.

Trial surveys with Mass Observation and the British Institute of Public Opinion were abandoned in September 1939 due to a fear of political criticism. The ‘collecting division’ was closed in October 1939 in effort to cut the number of people employed by the MOI.

The BBC producer Mary Adams was appointed director of a re-formed Home Intelligence division in November 1939. Her division started work in February 1940.

== Methods ==
Home Intelligence aimed to provide the government with ‘A continuous flow of reliable information’ that would act as a ‘barometer of public opinion’. It used both qualitative and quantitative research methods. The division compiled daily reports on morale from 18 May to 27 September, and weekly summaries from 27 September until 29 December 1944. Each report was based on material submitted by Regional Intelligence Officers, Mass Observation reports, BBC listener surveys, questionnaires and secret sources such as postal censorship. Home Intelligence also undertook more detailed reports on particular subjects and used the semi-autonomous Wartime Social Survey unit to undertake sample surveys. This part of the division’s work was expanded under the guidance of Dr Stephen Taylor, Baron Taylor (who replaced Mary Adams as director in April 1941).

== Findings ==
The daily, and later weekly, reports produced by the Home Intelligence Division were circulated within the Ministry of Information and other government departments. The circulation list from summer 1940 stood at around 100 copies. The director of Home Intelligence maintained that their work "provided a rapid and effective link between the people of the country and the machine of Government". Their work helped to promote an understanding of morale as something which was expressed by a mixture of attitudes and behaviour. The special reports conducted by Home Intelligence after 1941 were used by the Ministry of Information to plan and assess publicity campaigns. Over 60 reports were undertaken on campaigns including "Careless Talk Costs Lives" and Paper Salvage. Home Intelligence reports are now used as a primary source by historians researching the "Home Front".

== Criticisms ==
Home Intelligence was the subject of recurrent political controversies. The best known example occurred in July 1940 when information about the previously secret Wartime Social Survey was obtained by the editor of the Daily Herald. The paper began a fierce campaign against the use of "gestapo techniques", and coined the epithet "Cooper's Snoopers" (after Duff Cooper, the Minister of Information).

== Post-war ==
Home Intelligence was gradually wound down after 27 December 1944 and was officially abolished on 31 August 1945. However the Wartime Social Survey was maintained and its functions are now part of the Office for National Statistics.

== See also ==
- Ministry of Information (United Kingdom) - United Kingdom government department created during World War II
- Mass Observation - United Kingdom social research organisation founded in 1937.
