= Reginald Maudling =

British politician (1917–1979)

The Right Honourable Reginald Maudling
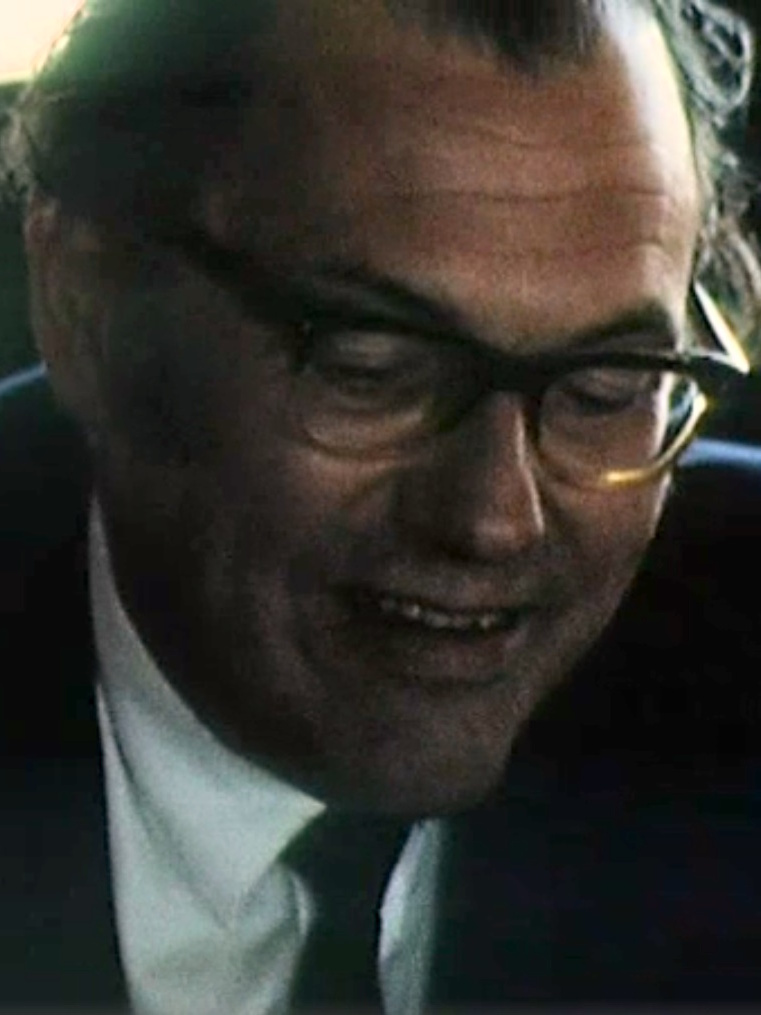
- Maudling in 1969

Home Secretary
- In office 20 June 1970 – 18 July 1972
- Prime Minister: Edward Heath
- Preceded by: James Callaghan
- Succeeded by: Robert Carr

Deputy Leader of the Opposition
- In office 4 August 1965 – 20 June 1970
- Leader: Edward Heath
- Preceded by: George Brown (Note: Office vacant since 16 October 1964.)
- Succeeded by: Roy Jenkins (Note: Office vacant until 8 July 1970.)

Chancellor of the Exchequer
- In office 13 July 1962 – 16 October 1964
- Prime Minister: Harold Macmillan; Alec Douglas-Home
- Preceded by: Selwyn Lloyd
- Succeeded by: James Callaghan

Secretary of State for the Colonies
- In office 9 October 1961 – 13 July 1962
- Prime Minister: Harold Macmillan
- Preceded by: Iain Macleod
- Succeeded by: Duncan Sandys

President of the Board of Trade
- In office 14 October 1959 – 9 October 1961
- Prime Minister: Harold Macmillan
- Preceded by: David Eccles
- Succeeded by: Frederick Erroll

Paymaster General
- In office 14 January 1957 – 14 October 1959
- Prime Minister: Harold Macmillan
- Preceded by: Walter Monckton
- Succeeded by: The Lord Mills

Minister of Supply
- In office 7 April 1955 – 14 January 1957
- Prime Minister: Anthony Eden
- Preceded by: Selwyn Lloyd
- Succeeded by: Aubrey Jones

Economic Secretary to the Treasury
- In office 24 November 1952 – 7 April 1955
- Prime Minister: Winston Churchill
- Preceded by: John Edwards
- Succeeded by: Edward Boyle
Shadow Cabinet portfolios
Shadow Foreign Secretary
In office 11 February 1975 – 11 April 1976
Leader	Margaret Thatcher
Preceded by	Geoffrey Rippon
Succeeded by	John Davies
In office 16 February 1965 – 4 August 1965
Leader	Alec Douglas-Home; Edward Heath
Preceded by	Rab Butler
Succeeded by	Christopher Soames
Shadow Secretary of State for Defence
In office 21 April 1968 – 14 November 1968
Leader	Edward Heath
Preceded by	Enoch Powell
Succeeded by	Geoffrey Rippon
Shadow Secretary of State for Commonwealth Affairs
In office 19 April 1966 – 21 April 1968
Leader	Edward Heath
Preceded by	Selwyn Lloyd
Succeeded by	Alec Douglas-Home
Shadow Chancellor of the Exchequer
In office 16 October 1964 – 16 February 1965
Leader	Alec Douglas-Home
Preceded by	James Callaghan
Succeeded by	Edward Heath

Member of Parliament for Chipping Barnet Barnet (1950–1974)
- In office 23 February 1950 – 14 February 1979
- Preceded by: Stephen Taylor
- Succeeded by: Sydney Chapman

Personal details
- Born: 7 March 1917 North Finchley, Middlesex, England
- Died: 14 February 1979 (aged 61) Hampstead, London, England
- Party: Conservative
- Spouse: Beryl Laverick (m. 1939)
- Children: 4
- Education: Merton College, Oxford

Reginald Maudling (7 March 1917 – 14 February 1979) was a British politician who served as Chancellor of the Exchequer from 1962 to 1964 and as Home Secretary from 1970 to 1972. From 1955 until the late 1960s, he was spoken of as a prospective Conservative leader, and he was twice seriously considered for the post; he was Edward Heath's chief rival in 1965. He also held directorships in several British financial firms.

As Home Secretary, he was responsible for the UK Government's Northern Ireland policy during the period that included Bloody Sunday. In July 1972, he resigned as Home Secretary due to an unrelated scandal in one of the companies of which he was director.

== Early life ==
Reginald Maudling was born in Woodside Park, North Finchley, and was named after his father, Reginald George Maudling, an actuary at R. Watson & Sons and Public Valuer, who contracted to do actuarial and financial calculations as the Commercial Calculating Company Ltd. The family moved to Bexhill to escape German air raids; Maudling won scholarships to the Merchant Taylors' School and Merton College, Oxford.

He stayed out of undergraduate politics at Oxford, and studied the works of Hegel; he was to formulate his conclusions later as to the inseparability of economic and political freedom: "the purpose of State control and the guiding principle of its application is the achievement of true freedom". He obtained a first class Greats degree.

== Political career ==
Shortly after graduating, Maudling set up a meeting with Harold Nicolson to discuss whether it would be better, as a moderate conservative, to join the Conservative Party or National Labour; Nicolson advised him to wait. Maudling was called to the Bar at the Middle Temple in 1940. However, he did not practise as a barrister, having volunteered for service in the Royal Air Force (RAF) in the Second World War.

Owing to poor eyesight he took desk jobs in the RAF intelligence branch, where he rose—as a "Wingless Wonder", as officers who were not qualified to wear pilot's wings were nicknamed—to the rank of flight lieutenant; he was then appointed Private Secretary to the Secretary of State for Air, Sir Archibald Sinclair.

=== Parliamentary candidate ===
Maudling wrote an essay on Conservative policy in November 1943, recommending that the Conservatives neither imitate the Labour Party nor reflexively oppose all controls; in the general election of July 1945, he was selected as parliamentary candidate for Heston and Isleworth, a newly created constituency in Middlesex, although there were four applicants and he had no ties to that constituency. In the subsequent Labour landslide Maudling was defeated like many others, although Heston and Isleworth had been expected to be a safe Conservative seat. After its defeat in the 1945 general election, the Conservative Party engaged in an extensive rethink of its policy. Maudling argued that the Party had depended excessively on outdated economic slogans and the popularity of Winston Churchill.

In November 1945, Maudling became the first staff member of the Conservative Parliamentary Secretariat, later the Conservative Research Department, where he was head of the Economic Section. He persuaded the party to accept much of the Labour government's nationalisation programme and social services while cutting government spending. In March 1946, Maudling was chosen as the prospective candidate for Barnet, close to his birthplace in Finchley, and began giving speeches there. Labour had unexpectedly won the seat in 1945, but it was considered to be marginal. In 1950, Maudling was elected as Member of Parliament with an absolute majority.

=== Member of Parliament and Cabinet ===
Following the 1951 election, Churchill made Maudling a junior Minister at the Ministry of Civil Aviation. However, his experience of preparing economic policy led to his speaking on behalf of the Treasury on the 1952 budget and thus to an appointment, later that year, as Economic Secretary to the Treasury. With his mentor Rab Butler as Chancellor of the Exchequer, Maudling worked to reduce taxes and controls in order to move from post-war austerity to affluence. When Anthony Eden took over as prime minister in 1955, Maudling was promoted to head a department as Minister of Supply. He supported the invasion of Suez.

The Ministry was responsible for aircraft production and supplying the armed forces, and Maudling came to agree with critics who argued that it was an unnecessary intermediary; he therefore recommended its abolition. Although supportive of Harold Macmillan's appointment as prime minister over the rival claims of Butler in 1957, Maudling found himself in difficulties over his position in the new government. He refused to continue at the Ministry of Supply and also rejected an offer of the Ministry of Health because Iain Macleod, with whom he had a rivalry, had held the post five years earlier and Maudling did not want to be seen as five years behind him.

Macmillan appointed Maudling to the post of Paymaster General and spokesman in the House of Commons for the Ministry of Fuel and Power, which was technically a demotion. Nine months later, Maudling had proved his usefulness; Macmillan brought him into the Cabinet on 17 September 1957, where he acted more as a Minister without Portfolio: he had specific responsibility for persuading the six members of the embryonic European Economic Community, who had recently signed the Treaty of Rome, to abandon their proposal for a customs union in favour of a wider free-trade area where each country would preserve their own external tariffs. However, Maudling's lack of international experience led him to underestimate the importance of the nascent Community and what was constructive in it. Faced with widespread rejection of the proposals, Maudling aroused hostility in Bonn and Paris by seeking to play off the Germans against the French.

On 14 November 1958, six months after the election of General de Gaulle as premier, Jacques Soustelle, the French Minister of Information, confirmed to the Press that France would reject the Maudling plan. Two days later, the British delegation to the Community formally called an end to accession negotiations. Maudling later revised his proposals, which were to form the basis of the European Free Trade Association.

Meanwhile, Maudling became an underwriting member of Lloyd's of London in December 1957, although his assets were somewhat below average for other 'names'.

=== President of the Board of Trade ===
Maudling entered the front line of politics after the 1959 election when appointed President of the Board of Trade. He was responsible for introducing the government's proposals to help areas of high unemployment. This was achieved by paying grants to companies to create new plants in these deprived areas, and also by the government taking over unused land for development. Maudling also succeeded in negotiating a free trade agreement between the countries outside the Common Market; this became the European Free Trade Association and was some compensation for his failure to negotiate a free trade area with the Common Market. Maudling was opposed to any proposal to join the Common Market on the basis that it would end Britain's right to make commercial agreements with New Zealand and Australia. He was later to remark that "I can think of no more retrograde step economically or politically". This comment was to be quoted against him when, less than two years later, he was Chancellor of the Exchequer at the time of the reopening of negotiations for Common Market membership.

=== Colonial Secretary ===
Reginald Maudling was for a short time, as Secretary of State for the Colonies in 1961, responsible for the process of decolonisation. In this position he chaired constitutional conferences for Jamaica, Northern Rhodesia and Trinidad and Tobago which prepared them for independence; his plan for Northern Rhodesia was controversial and he had to threaten resignation before it was approved. However, Maudling was keen to return to economic policy, and seized his opportunity when Macmillan made it clear in private that he supported a voluntary incomes policy. Maudling promptly made his case in public, and three weeks later was appointed Chancellor of the Exchequer in Macmillan's "Night of the Long Knives" attempt to rejuvenate his Cabinet.

=== Chancellor of the Exchequer ===
As Chancellor, Maudling soon cut purchase tax and bank interest rates. His 1963 budget aimed at "expansion without inflation". Following a period of economic difficulty, with a growth target of 4%, Maudling was able to remove income tax from owner-occupiers' residential premises. He also abolished the rate of duty on home-brewed beer which in effect legalised it. This was the period in which Maudling was at his most popular within the Conservative Party and in the country.

However, later commentators have been less kind to Maudling: Harold Wilson and his Chancellor James Callaghan (who nevertheless sounded out Maudling for the governorship of the Bank of England in 1966) blamed the "dash for growth" that followed the 1963 budget for increasing sterling's chronic instability between 1964 and 1967 and by greatly increasing domestic demand the budget certainly exacerbated the existing balance of payments problem. Maudling largely recognised this himself by the time of the 1964 budget and, although he increased taxes, he did little to subdue demand in an election year.

=== First unsuccessful leadership bid ===
By 1963, during the Profumo affair, there was talk, encouraged by Martin Redmayne (Chief Whip) and Lord Poole (Party Chairman), of Maudling succeeding Macmillan as prime minister. Maudling visited Butler (then Deputy Prime Minister) and obtained a mutual promise that they would, if necessary, agree to serve under one another; Maudling believed that he had gained an advantage in obtaining the agreement of Butler, his senior, to serve under him if necessary. William Rees-Mogg claimed in The Times on 28 July that Butler led Maudling by 2:1 in the Cabinet, although Maudling had more support amongst backbench MPs.

Macmillan's sudden illness and announcement of his resignation in October 1963 came at a time when Maudling's support had fallen. He was also poorly received at the Conservative Party conference (which had become a launching-pad for the party leadership), despite having received coaching from Iain Macleod, in how to deliver his speech. When he was back in London the following week, a process of 'consultation', by Lord Chancellor Dilhorne and by Redmayne, determined that Foreign Secretary Lord Home, rather than Maudling or Butler, would be the best choice for compromise candidate. Enoch Powell, Macleod, Hailsham and Maudling (known as 'the Quad' in some accounts of the following days) sought to persuade Butler to refuse to serve under Home, in the hope of ensuring that Butler rather than Home would have to become prime minister. Macleod and Maudling demanded that Dilhorne lay the results of his consultations before the Cabinet, but he refused.

Maudling attended the meeting at Powell's house late in the evening of 17 October, 'well-refreshed' after attending a formal dinner – an early sign of the excessive alcohol intake that would later shorten his career and his life – yet he seems to have gone along with the succession plot rather than to have been a ringleader in it, although he and Hailsham agreed to serve under Butler. At any rate, on the morning of Saturday 19 October, first Butler, and then Maudling, agreed to serve under Home after all. This support enabled Home to accept office as prime minister.

Maudling retained his post as Chancellor under the new prime minister. In the 1964 election, Maudling had a prominent role at the helm of the party's daily press conferences, while Douglas-Home toured the country. On the BBC's election results programme, the journalist Anthony Howard said that he believed that if Maudling had been leader, the narrow Conservative defeat would have been a narrow Conservative victory. Upon being forced out of the post by the election defeat, Maudling left a handwritten note to his Labour successor, James Callaghan, simply stating Good luck, old cock ... Sorry to leave it in such a mess.

=== Second unsuccessful leadership bid ===
Out of office, Maudling accepted the offer of a seat on the board of Kleinwort Benson in November 1964, one of the factors which led to his being shifted to spokesman on Foreign Affairs in early 1965. Unlike other potential leadership contenders, Maudling publicly maintained his loyalty to Douglas-Home as criticisms of his leadership mounted. When Douglas-Home resigned, after putting in place a system in which the leadership was directly elected, Maudling fought against Edward Heath for the position of candidate to the party centre-right.

Unfortunately for Maudling, Enoch Powell also stood, but he was a candidate supporting monetarist and proto-Thatcherite economics, which at that time had little support. Powell won 15 votes. Maudling won 133 votes against Heath's 150; Powell's 15 votes were seen as more likely to have gone to Maudling had Powell not stood, but they would have made no difference to Heath's narrow majority. This was a moment of philosophical instability for the Conservatives. Their historic scepticism of Keynesianism began to grow through the 1960s because there was little to distinguish between the policies of the Conservatives and Labour. The cross-party support for economic planning and union negotiation was becoming increasingly unable to stimulate high levels of economic growth.

Maudling's business directorships with Kleinwort Benson and others were mentioned by his opponents as evidence of his lack of commitment for the role, and he was criticised as too close to the Macmillan/Douglas-Home style of politics.

=== Deputy Leader and Home Secretary ===
Maudling served as Deputy Leader under Heath, and was also a prominent member of the Shadow Cabinet. However, he was neither personally nor politically close to Heath, and as a consequence his influence declined; his support for an incomes policy now went against party policy. He also tended to make gaffes, as for example when he said Harold Wilson had been following the same policy as the Conservatives on Rhodesia and "I can't think of anything he has done wrongly". After Enoch Powell had been sacked from the Shadow Cabinet in 1968 for his controversial Rivers of Blood speech, Maudling was moved from the position of Shadow Commonwealth Secretary to become Shadow Defence Secretary until 1969 when he was replaced by Geoffrey Rippon. When the Conservatives returned to power in 1970, Maudling was appointed Home Secretary; the most pressing problem at the Home Office was tackling the Troubles in Northern Ireland. After boarding the aircraft at the end of his first visit to the region, he remarked "For God's sake bring me a large Scotch. What a bloody awful country." When Iain Macleod, who had been appointed as Chancellor in the new Conservative Government, died after barely a month in office, it was reported in The Glasgow Herald that Maudling "was being consistently tipped" at Westminster to move from the Home Office back to his old post. Ultimately the post went to Anthony Barber.

Maudling's attitude of reassuring calmness in interviews, normally helpful to him, was sometimes damaging. At a 15 December 1971 news conference in Belfast, Maulding said that the British Army had the power to reduce IRA violence to "something which is acceptable", a remark widely regarded as a gaffe. He also tended to trust the Unionist-controlled Government of Northern Ireland and gloss over differences between their approach and that of the United Kingdom government. This backfired when the Prime Minister of Northern Ireland, James Chichester-Clark, resigned when denied the full number of troops he requested in March 1971. That August, Maudling authorised the Northern Ireland government to introduce internment without trial for terror suspects, which caused widespread upheaval and anger among the nationalist population due to its exclusive use on that community, and was followed by an already planned massive escalation in the level of violence.

Regarding criminal justice, Maudling made no attempt, despite his personal support, to reintroduce capital punishment after its abolition in 1969. He introduced Community Service, a new alternative to prison, and in 1971 introduced further restrictions on immigration of Commonwealth migrants. He was criticised for ordering the deportation of Rudi Dutschke, a leader of the German student movement. Dutschke, who was in Britain to recuperate from an assassination attempt, was considered a student anarchist.

Maudling was often the target of satirical cartoons in major newspapers, and was lampooned in the magazine Private Eye and the television comedy show Monty Python's Flying Circus.

=== Bloody Sunday ===
After soldiers from the Parachute Regiment shot and killed 14 protestors from a Northern Ireland Civil Rights Association (NICRA) march on 30 January 1972, Maudling gave a statement in the House of Commons, agreeing with statements published by army spokesmen claiming that the regiment had only opened fire in self-defence. Northern Irish politician and MP Bernadette Devlin, who had been present in Derry when the incident occurred, attempted to respond to Maudling's statement but was denied, in defiance of established protocol, by Speaker of the House Selwyn Lloyd; Devlin responded by walking across the commons floor and slapping Maudling. Devlin subsequently told journalists that Maudling's statement contained numerous falsehoods and expressed no regrets for the victims of the incident. Eventually, Edward Heath decided to bring in direct rule of Northern Ireland under a separate Secretary of State. In 1974, Shane Paul O'Doherty, an IRA member, sent Maudling a letter bomb, which slightly injured him.

=== Scandal ===
In 1972, Maudling's business activities were causing considerable disquiet and speculation in the press. In 1966, he had obtained a directorship in the company of John Poulson, an architect Maudling helped obtain lucrative contracts. Poulson routinely did business through bribery and in 1972 was made bankrupt. The bankruptcy hearings disclosed his bribe payments, and Maudling's connection became public knowledge. Maudling came to the decision that his responsibility for the Metropolitan Police, which was beginning fraud investigations into Poulson, made his position as Home Secretary untenable. He resigned on 18 July, to general sympathy from the press.

Shortly after receiving Maudling's resignation, Edward Heath's government performed a 'U-turn' on economic policy and subsequently adopted an approach strikingly similar to Maudling's. Heath advised Maudling not to drop out of the public eye and he continued to make many media appearances. In the year after the Conservative Party's electoral defeat in 1974, Heath was replaced as leader by Margaret Thatcher. She appointed Maudling to the post of Shadow Foreign Secretary. However, Maudling clashed with Thatcher over economics, and after less than two years in the role he was dismissed on 19 November 1976. Departing, Maudling summed up his career as "hired by Winston Churchill, fired by Margaret Thatcher".

== Last years ==
In 1969, Maudling had been president of the Real Estate Fund of America, whose chief executive, Jerome Hoffman, had been imprisoned for fraud; Maudling had also been an adviser to the Peachey Property Corporation, whose chairman, Sir Eric Miller, had embezzled company money and later took his own life. He was revealed to have lobbied for more aid to Malta after obtaining a commission for Poulson there, which had led to heavy losses for the Maltese government. These further revelations led to a Parliamentary inquiry into the conduct of Maudling and two other MPs linked to Poulson. This inquiry published its report on 14 July 1977; the report concluded that Maudling had indulged in "conduct inconsistent with the standards which the House is entitled to expect from its members".

When the report was considered by the House of Commons, the Conservative Party organised its MPs to attend the debate to "Save Reggie". An amendment was put down to "take note" of the report, instead of endorsing it, and carried by 230 votes (211 Conservatives, 17 Labour, 2 Liberals and 2 Ulster Unionists) to 207. No punishment was imposed. An attempt by backbench Labour MPs to expel Maudling from the House was defeated by 331 votes to 11, and a move to suspend him for six months was lost by 324 to 97.

As Lewis Baston's 2004 biography recounts, Maudling and his wife became heavy drinkers once his political career was effectively ended by the scandal. The drinking turned to alcoholism and Maudling's health rapidly deteriorated in the late 1970s. He collapsed in early 1979.

== Death ==
Maudling died at the Royal Free Hospital in London, from kidney failure and cirrhosis of the liver, on 14 February 1979; he was 61. His body was buried in the churchyard of Little Berkhamsted in Hertfordshire. A stone seat from his garden was placed beside the grave.

== Family life ==
Maudling married actress Beryl Laverick (1919–1988) in 1939. They had three sons and a daughter, Caroline Maudling, who became a journalist in the 1960s as the "travelling teenager" of the Daily Mail and, among other things, appeared alongside John Lennon on BBC TV's Juke Box Jury in 1963.

Maudling's mother had disowned him as a result of his marriage, and Maudling did not attend her funeral in 1956. When Caroline aroused comment by having a child out of wedlock in the late 1960s, Maudling was staunch in her defence, publicly expressing paternal pride. Beryl Maudling's body was buried next to her husband's at Little Berkhamsted.

== In popular culture ==
Maudling was portrayed by actor Michael Culkin in the BBC-produced 2018 limited television series A Very English Scandal. He was also frequently referred to in the BBC television comedy series Monty Python’s Flying Circus. He was the basis for the character of Claude Seabrook, played by Julian Fellowes, in the 1996 miniseries Our Friends in the North.

== See also ==
- List of deaths through alcohol
- Acceptable level of violence

== Notes ==
Parliament of the United Kingdom
Preceded by Stephen Taylor	Member of Parliament for Barnet; 1950 – 1974	Constituency abolished
New constituency	Member of Parliament for Chipping Barnet; 1974–1979	Succeeded by Sydney Chapman
Political offices
Preceded by John Edwards	Economic Secretary to the Treasury; 1952–1955	Succeeded by Edward Boyle
Preceded by Selwyn Lloyd	Minister of Supply; 1955–1957	Succeeded by Aubrey Jones
Preceded by Walter Monckton	Paymaster General; 1957–1959	Succeeded by The Lord Mills
Preceded by David Eccles	President of the Board of Trade; 1959–1961	Succeeded by Fred Erroll
Preceded by Iain Macleod	Secretary of State for the Colonies; 1961–1962	Succeeded by Duncan Sandys
Preceded by Selwyn Lloyd	Chancellor of the Exchequer; 1962–1964	Succeeded by James Callaghan
Preceded by James Callaghan	Shadow Chancellor of the Exchequer; 1964–1965	Succeeded by Edward Heath
Preceded by Rab Butler	Shadow Foreign Secretary; 1965	Succeeded by Christopher Soames
Preceded by Rab Butler	Deputy Leader of the Opposition; 1965–1970	Succeeded by Roy Jenkins
Preceded by Enoch Powell	Shadow Secretary of State for Defence; 1968–1969	Succeeded by Geoffrey Rippon
Preceded by James Callaghan	Home Secretary; 1970–1972	Succeeded by Robert Carr
Preceded by Geoffrey Rippon	Shadow Foreign Secretary; 1975–1976	Succeeded by John Davies
Party political offices
New title	Deputy Leader of the Conservative Party; 1965–1972	Vacant Title next held by William Whitelaw
