= Civilian casualties from the United States drone strikes =

Overview of civilian casualties from U.S. drone strikes

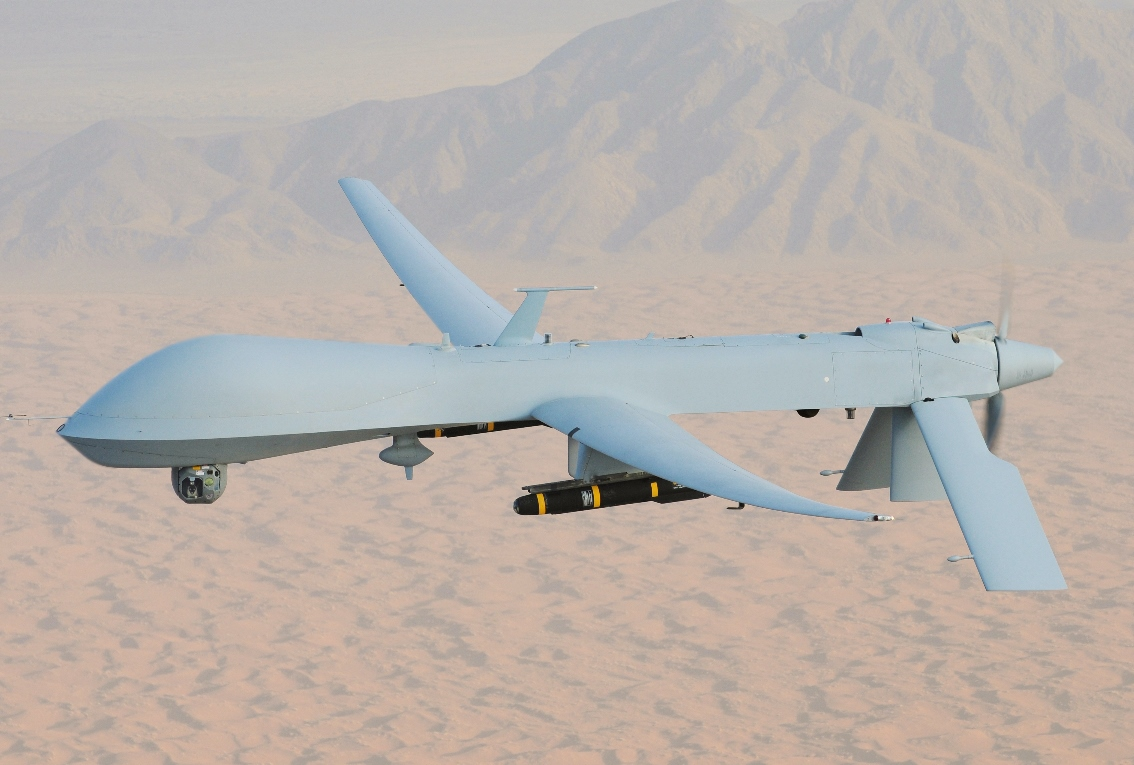
A United States Air Force drone, 2008

Since the September 11 attacks, the United States has carried out drone strikes in Pakistan, Yemen, Somalia, Afghanistan, Iraq and Libya.

Drone strikes are part of a targeted killing campaign against militants. Determining precise counts of the total number killed, as well as the number of non-combatant civilians killed, is impossible; and tracking of strikes and estimates of casualties are compiled by a number of organizations, such as the Long War Journal (Pakistan and Yemen), the New America Foundation (Pakistan, Yemen, Somalia, and Libya), and the London-based Bureau of Investigative Journalism (Yemen, Somalia, and Pakistan). The "estimates of civilian casualties are hampered methodologically and practically"; civilian casualty estimates "are largely compiled by interpreting news reports relying on anonymous officials or accounts from local media, whose credibility may vary."

Sometimes, the U.S. military conducted in-depth investigations in cases when U.S. forces killed or injured civilians (including drone strikes in Somalia and Yemen). At times, these investigations have resulted in the military publicly acknowledging and explaining the reasons behind the civilian harm; providing condolence payments to families; and, in some cases where members of the military have violated the law, they have been held accountable. However, in many cases the military failed to conduct effective investigations.

== Total numbers ==
=== Independent estimates ===
Taken together, independent estimates from the non-governmental organizations New America and the Bureau of Investigative Journalism suggest that civilians made up between 7.27% to 15.47% of deaths in U.S. drone strikes in Pakistan, Yemen, and Somalia from 2009–2016, with a broadly similar rate from 2017–2019. Civilian casualties as a percentage of overall deaths were highest in Yemen and lowest in Somalia.

The New America figures report that:

- The first known U.S. drone strike in Pakistan was June 19, 2004, and the most recent U.S. drone strike as of the report's publication was in Pakistan on July 4, 2018. Over those 14 years, there were 413 reported strikes in Pakistan (with the peak being in 2010), which killed a total of between 2,366 and 3,702 people; of the total deaths, between 245 and 303 were civilians.
- The first known U.S. drone strike in Yemen was November 3, 2002 (killing al-Qaeda operative Qaed Salim Sinan al-Harethi), and the most recent U.S. drone strike in Yemen as of the report's publication was May 17, 2020. Over those 18 years, there were 374 reported strikes in Yemen (with the peak being in 2012), which killed a total of between 1,378 and 1,775 people; of the total deaths, between 115 and 149 were civilians.
- In Libya, from the end of the 2011 UN-approved military intervention through March 31, 2020, there were 4,500 air, drone, and artillery strikes in Libya, carried out by many warring Libyan factions and their foreign supporters including the American, Russian, United Arab Emirates, Turkish, and Egyptian governments. The U.S. carried out 550 strikes (from all methods, not just drones), almost all of them in Operation Odyssey Lightning in 2016. The U.S. strikes killed between 238 and 298 people, of whom between 227 and 277 were combatants, and between 11 and 21 were civilians.
- In Somalia, there were a total of 263 U.S. counter-terrorism airstrikes, drone strikes, and ground raids from 2003 to 2021. Of the 263, the majority (202) occurred under the Trump administration. Collectively, between 1,479 and 1,886 people have been killed in the U.S. strikes in Somalia: between 1,389 and 1,696 militants, between 34 and 121 civilians, and between 56 and 69 unknowns.

The Bureau of Investigative Journalism (BIJ) reported the following figures for U.S. strikes from January 2004 through February 2020. For Pakistan, the BIJ figures below cover only U.S. drone strikes; for Yemen, Afghanistan and Somalia, the BIJ figures include both drone strikes and other actions, including airstrikes, missile attacks, and ground operations.

Country	Minimum strikes	Civilians dead	Children dead	Total dead	Injured	Total casualties	Ref(s)
Afghanistan	13,072	300–909	66–184	4,126–10,076	658–1,769	4784–11,845	
Somalia	202	12–97	1–13	1,197–1,410	55–101	1252–1,511	
Pakistan	430	424–969	172–207	2,515–4,026	1,162–1,749	3,677–5,775	
Yemen	336	174–225	44–50	1,020–1,389	155–303	1175–1,692	
Total	14,040	910–2,200	283–454	8,858–16,901	2,030–3,922	10,888–20,823	

=== Office of the Director of National Intelligence ===
The Office of the Director of National Intelligence reported that:

- Between January 20, 2009, and December 31, 2015: 473 U.S. strikes "against terrorist targets outside areas of active hostilities" (i.e., outside Afghanistan, Iraq, and Syria) with between 2,372 and 2,581 combatant deaths and between 64 and 116 non-combatant deaths, i.e., a civilian casualty rate of 2.63–4.30%.
- For the calendar year 2016: 53 U.S. strikes "against terrorist targets outside areas of active hostilities" (i.e., outside Afghanistan, Iraq, and Syria) with 431-441 combatant deaths and 1 non-combatant death; i.e., a civilian casualty rate of 0.2%.

Both the 2009-2015 and the 2016 DNI reports state: "Non-combatants are individuals who may not be made the object of attack under applicable international law. The term 'non-combatant' does not include an individual who is part of a belligerent party to an armed conflict, an individual who is taking a direct part in hostilities, or an individual who is targetable in the exercise of U.S. national self-defense. Males of military age may be non-combatants; it is not the case that all military-aged males in the vicinity of a target are deemed to be combatants."

As the DNI reports acknowledge, the government's reported numbers of civilian casualties are far lower than estimates from non-governmental organizations. Scholar Nicholas Grossman, who studies drone strikes, wrote that the official figures "systematically underestimated civilian casualties" and notes that independent estimates suggest a substantially higher rate of civilian casualties, which is likely attributable to the government methodology for classifying an individual as a "combatant." DNI explains this discrepancy as the result of three causes: (1) the U.S. government "uses post-strike methodologies that have been refined and honed over the years and that use information that is generally unavailable to non-governmental organizations," such as sensitive intelligence reliably indicating "that certain individuals are combatants" although but are being counted as non-combatants by nongovernmental organizations; (2) that the U.S. government uses "post-strike reviews involve the collection and analysis of multiple sources of intelligence before, during, and after a strike, including video observations, human sources and assets, signals intelligence, geospatial intelligence, accounts from local officials on the ground, and open source reporting" and that this often unique set of information "can provide insights that are likely unavailable to non-governmental organizations" and "frequently enables U.S. Government analysts to confirm, among other things, the number of individuals killed as well as their combatant status"; and (3) some terrorist groups and other actors deliberately promote misinformation "in local media reports on which some non-governmental estimates rely."

== Sources of evidence ==
Assessing civilian versus militant casualties is difficult. The New America count relies on multiple sources, such as reporting from international and local journalists, corroborating evidence from social media, reports from non-governmental organization (NGOs), and official reports from the U.S. military. The Bureau of Investigative Journalism count also draws from a variety of sources.

Some scholars and human rights activists, such as Sarah Knuckey and Radhya Al-Mutawakel, criticize the U.S. Defense Department failing to "regularly interview" eyewitnesses as part of investigations into civilian casualties, arguing that this is "a critical flaw in their investigation methodology" and that the U.S. military could overcome obstacles such as a "lack of on-the-ground networks, security concerns and/or issues related to impartiality." In response, scholar Charles J. Dunlap argues that the Defense Department does incorporate witness accounts in its assessments, and that over-reliance on witness statements can be problematic since eyewitness testimony and memory are often unreliable.

In February 2013, Senator Dianne Feinstein, the chair of the Senate Intelligence Committee, said in a hearing, "But for the past several years, this committee has done significant oversight of the government's conduct of targeted strikes and the figures we have obtained from the executive branch, which we have done our utmost to verify, confirm that the number of civilian casualties that have resulted from such strikes has typically been in the single digits."

Leaked CIA documents provided to The Washington Post in 2013, showed that top Pakistani government officials "have for years secretly endorsed the [CIA’s drone] program and routinely received classified briefings on strikes and casualty counts". The documents indicate that the CIA has "remarkable confidence" in the accuracy of the drone strikes, with the documents often showing no civilian casualties. The Washington Post said this was "at odds with research done by human rights organizations, including Amnesty International".

== Approvals of drone strikes ==
During the Obama administration, proposed U.S. drone strikes in locations outside active war zones (i.e., in Pakistan, Yemen, Somalia) required high-level approval. The Obama administration process for approving drone strikes in such locations featured centralized, high-level oversight, based on intelligence about individuals suspected of terrorism activity. Obama's approval was required for every strike in Yemen and Somalia, as well as "the more complex and risky strikes in Pakistan" (about one-third of the total as of 2012), and insisted on deciding whether to approve a strike unless the CIA had a "near certainty" that no civilian deaths would result. The process, formalized in a 2013 Presidential Policy Guidance document, was intended to reduce civilian casualties and blowback risks by requiring the targeted person to present a "continuing and imminent threat" to Americans. The process often required multiple interagency meetings to decide whether to go forward with a strike. However, some U.S. military and intelligence officials opposed the restrictive nature of the system, and some Republicans criticized it as too cautious. However, in the pre-strike review, Obama "embraced a disputed method for counting civilian casualties" that effectively counted "all military-age males in a strike zone as combatants, according to several administration officials, unless there is explicit intelligence posthumously proving them innocent." Counterterrorism officials defended this approach on the idea that people located in close proximity to known terrorists were likely combatants; some Obama administration officials were critical of this approach, who said that it led to implausibly low official counts of civilian deaths, with one administration official telling the New York Times that it amounted to "guilt by association."

In October 2017, Trump abolished the Obama-era approval system in favor of a looser, decentralized approach, which gave the military and CIA officials the discretion to decide to launch drone strikes against targets without White House approval. This policy reduced accountability for drone strikes. After Joe Biden took office, he halted counterterrorism drone strikes without White House approval and initiated a broad review of U.S. policy on drone use.

== Disclosure of figures by U.S. government ==
On July 1, 2016, President Barack Obama signed an executive order requiring annual accounting of civilian and enemy casualties in U.S. drone strikes outside war zones ("Areas Outside of Active Hostilities"), and setting a deadline of May 1 each year for the release of such report. However, soon after taking office, President Donald Trump designated large areas in Yemen and Somalia to be "areas of active hostilities," thus exempting them from disclosure. The Trump administration also ignored the 2017 and 2018 deadlines for an annual accounting, and on March 6, 2019, Trump issued an order revoking the requirement. However, since 2016, Congress has enacted legislation separately requiring the Defense Department to release "annual reports about bystander deaths from all of its operations" including strikes inside war zones (such as Afghanistan and Syria). For example, disclosure is required pursuant to Section 1057 of the National Defense Authorization Act for Fiscal Year 2018. This legislation requiring disclosure of bystander deaths, however, covers only Defense Department drone strikes and does not extend to separate CIA drone strikes.

== Afghanistan ==
After more than 30 UAV (Unarmed Aerial Vehicle) strikes hit civilian homes in Afghanistan in 2012, President Hamid Karzai demanded that such attacks end, but the practice continues in areas of Pakistan, Yemen, and Somalia. Former U.S. President Jimmy Carter has criticized such use of UAVs: "We don't know how many hundreds of innocent civilians have been killed in these attacks ... This would have been unthinkable in previous times."

The U.S. launched an investigation following an August 2021 drone attack in Kabul that killed 7 children, their father who worked for a U.S. employer, and other family members. On September 17, the Department of Defense confirmed that the strike was a "tragic mistake" and killed 10 civilians.

== Pakistan ==
In October 2013, the Pakistani government revealed that since 2008, civilian casualties made up 3 percent of deaths from drone strikes. Since 2008, it alleges there have been 317 drone strikes that killed 2,160 Islamic militants and 67 civilians. This is less than previous government and independent organization calculations of collateral damage from these attacks. S. Azmat Hassan, a former ambassador of Pakistan, said in July 2009 that American UAV attacks were turning Pakistani opinion against the United States and that 35 or 40 such attacks killed 8 or 9 top al-Qaeda operatives.

A 2011 report from the Bureau of Investigative Journalism (BIJ) identified at least 385 civilians killed in seven years of CIA drone strikes in Pakistan's Federally Administered Tribal Areas, including "credible reports" of 168 child deaths. The BIJ found that the highest number of child deaths in drone strikes occurred during the presidency of George W. Bush, and that child fatalities had fallen after August 2010. Also in 2011, the BIJ found that there were "at least 1,117 people whose injuries were severe enough to merit a mention in press reports," and that these were "a mixture of militants and civilians, adults and children, though their names are rarely reported." A 2012 analysis of the U.S. drone campaign in Pakistan by Peter Bergen of the New America Foundation found that the "number of militants reported killed by drone strikes is 89% of the fatalities under Obama compared to 67% under Bush." Bergen wrote, "Since it began in 2004, the drone campaign has killed 49 militant leaders whose deaths have been confirmed by at least two credible news sources. While this represents a significant blow to the militant chain of command, these 49 deaths account for only 2% of all drone-related fatalities."

== Yemen ==
An attack by the US in December 2013, in a wedding procession in Yemen, killed 12 men and wounded at least 15 other people, including the bride. US and Yemeni officials said the dead were members of the armed group Al-Qaeda in the Arabian Peninsula (AQAP), but witnesses and relatives told Human Rights Watch the casualties were civilians. Witnesses and relatives told Human Rights Watch that no members of AQAP were in the procession and provided names and other information about those killed and wounded. They said the dead included the groom's adult son and the bride received superficial face wounds. The local governor and military commander called the casualties a "mistake" and gave money and assault rifles to the families of those killed and wounded – a traditional gesture of apology in Yemen. A few days after the incident, Yemeni MPs voted for a ban against the use of drones in Yemen, though it is unclear what effect this will have on drone usage.

In January 2021, a group of 34 Yemenis submitted a petition against the United States government to the Inter-American Commission on Human Rights with the help of U.K-based human rights group Reprieve. The petition calls out the U.S. Special Operations raid and six drone strikes that took place in Yemen's Bayda province from 2013 to 2018 and resulted in civilian casualties for the Ameri family and the Taisy family. The petition also includes documents describing rural life and counterterrorism action in Bayda.

== Criticism ==
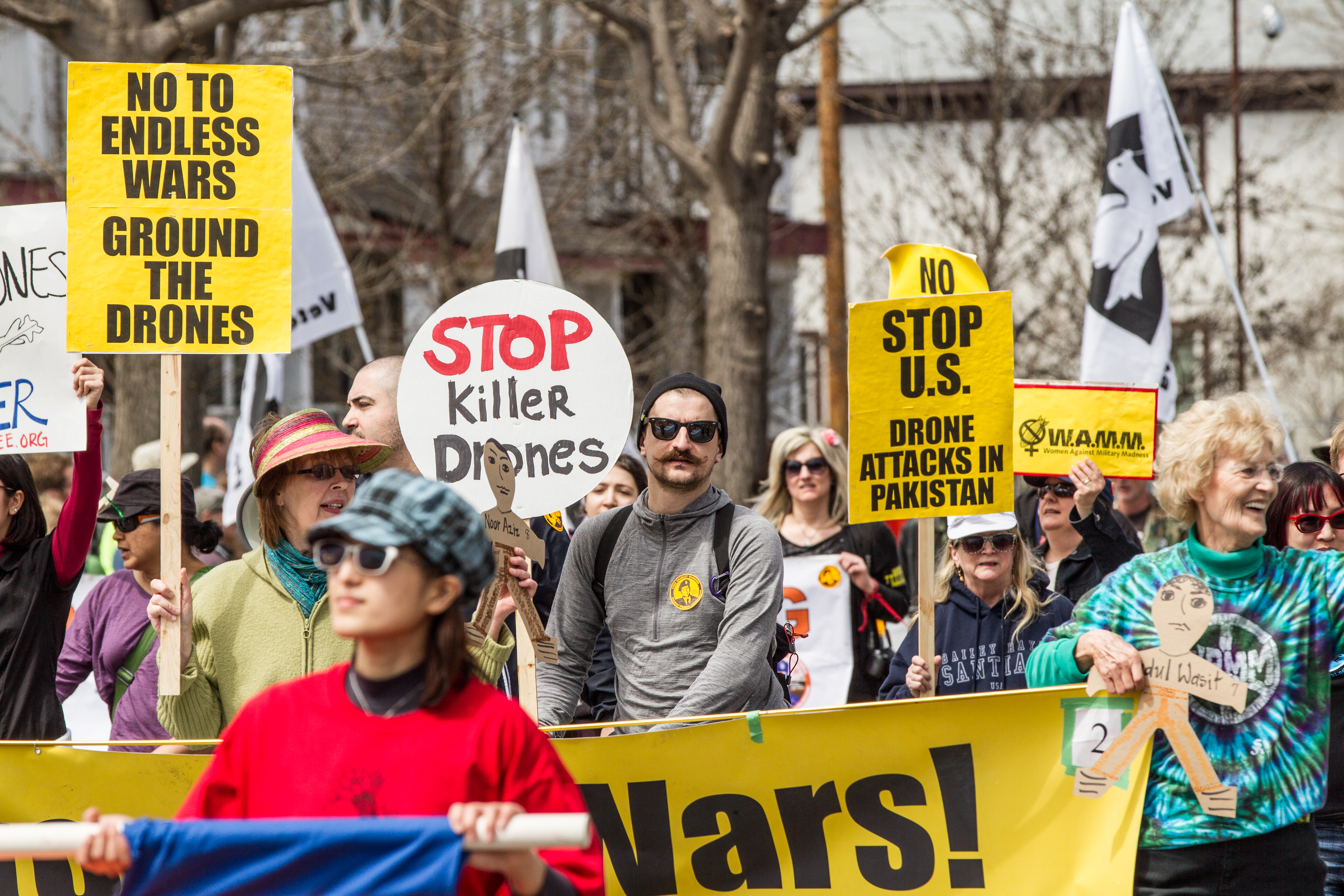
Minneapolis anti-war protest: 'Stop Killer Drones', 5 May 2013

There are several vocal critics of the use of UAVs to track and kill terrorists and militants. A major criticism of drone strikes is that they result in excessive collateral damage. David Kilcullen and Andrew Exum wrote in the New York Times that drone strikes "have killed about 14 terrorist leaders". It has also killed an unknown number of militants. But, according to Pakistani sources, they have also killed some 700 civilians. It is difficult to reconcile figures of civilian casualties because the drone strikes are often in areas that are inaccessible to independent observers and the data includes reports by local officials and local media, neither of whom are reliable sources.

Grégoire Chamayou's analysis, of one three-hour-long surveillance and attack operation on a convoy of three UAVs that killed civilians in Afghanistan in February 2010, shows a typical, if notorious, case. Throughout the operation, there is a sense of the drone controllers’ desperation to kill the people and destroy the vehicles — whatever the evidence of their clearly civilian nature. The transcript is full of statements like "that truck would make a beautiful target"; "Oh, sweet target!"; "the men appear to be moving tactically"; and "They’re going to do something nefarious".

Critics also fear that by making killing seem clean and safe, so-called surgical UAV strikes will allow the United States to remain in a perpetual state of war. However, others maintain that drones "allow for a much closer review and much more selective targeting process than do other instruments of warfare" and are subject to Congressional oversight. Like any military technology, armed UAVs will kill people, combatants and innocents alike. Noted sociologist Amitai Etzioni, writing in a 2013 Military Review article concluded "the main turning point concerns the question of whether we should go to war at all."

In a 2013 Georgetown University Law Center paper, law professor Rosa Brooks argued that UAV strikes threaten the international rule of law because they are difficult to place in legal categories and they change the meaning of important legal concepts like "self-defense", "combatant", and "armed conflict", among others. Brooks asserted that the U.S.' legal justifications for UAV attacks are confusing because they switch from focusing on self-defense to armed conflict. The international law concept of imminence is also put into question as a result of U.S. justifications. Brooks notes the shift from an imminence standard requiring states to have "concrete knowledge of an actual impending attack" to the U.S. justifying UAV strikes with a "lack of knowledge of a future attack".

== See also ==
- Non-combatant casualty value
- Casualty recording
- Unmanned combat aerial vehicle
- Unmanned aerial vehicles in the United States military
