= Wartime Social Survey =

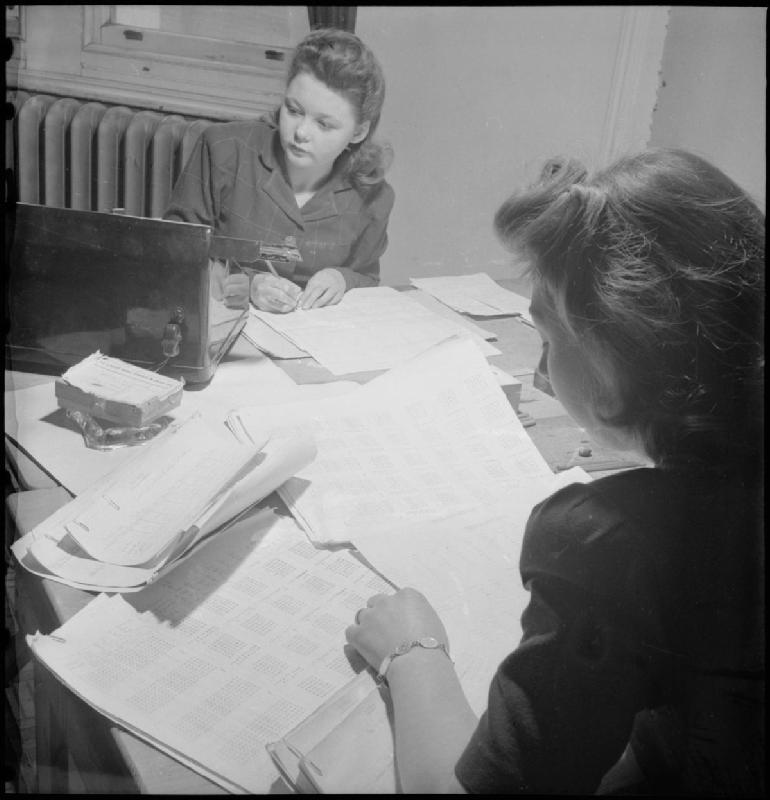
Members of staff at the Wartime Social Survey collate information in the coding room. Information from interviewers arrives in the form of ringed answers to questions on a questionnaire, and, here in the coding room, these answers are all given a code number (1944)

The Wartime Social Survey was the British Government's social research unit which was created during World War II to provide any government department with the information required for forming and administering government policy, when that information could not be obtained by other means. It was founded in April 1940 by Duff Cooper under the auspices of the National Institute of Economic and Social Research and worked from the London School of Economics. Whenever Home Intelligence (part of the Ministry of Information) undertook detailed reports on particular subjects it used the semi-autonomous Wartime Social Survey unit to undertake sampling surveys. The Wartime Social Survey was concerned with ascertaining the state of national morale by investigating social problems with the aim of establishing facts and discerning the attitude of the British public towards these facts.

Initially, only two government departments, the Ministry of Information and the Ministry of Food, had the need for market research in order to investigate the effectiveness of their advertising with the British public. The Wartime Social Survey was founded to carry out this work, but it quickly became obvious that other government departments also faced problems that could only be resolved by interviewing samples of the public, and therefore the work of the Survey was extended to carry out sampling surveys for the Board of Trade, the Ministry of Health, the Ministry of Home Security, the Ministry of Works, the Ministry of Supply, the Ministry of War Transport, the Ministry of Fuel and Power, and the War Office.

The Survey's method was to use questionnaires and to interview samples of the general public, or specific sections of the general public, in order to provide statistical results. The surveys were carried out by fifty-five trained female fieldworkers, disparagingly called "Cooper's Snoopers" (after founder Duff Cooper) by the press, divided into two teams who were able to travel around Britain in order to carry out their surveys. In addition, there were regional investigators who lived in the areas in which they worked. These were so distributed around Britain that they could cover large centres of population as well as smaller towns and rural communities.

The benefits of these arrangements were that the mobile teams of fieldworkers could carry out surveys in any part of the country as required, of that they could all be sent to one area. Meanwhile, the regional investigators were able to collect specialised information about the areas in which they lived and worked and reported to the officials of Government departments, who could often provide valuable information about the locality being surveyed.

The Wartime Social Survey had 35 technical, administrative and clerical staff and had an annual budget of about £40,000. Between 1943 and 1944 the Survey carried out thirty-six surveys of varying length.

Among the surveys carried out was a 1944 study where housewives were asked to check the size of food portions against a chart, while another conducted in 1943, found that 32% of Britons went to the cinema frequently (defined as once a week or more) and another 38% attended occasionally (defined as once a fortnight or less)".

The first Director of the Wartime Social Survey and of Home Intelligence was Stephen Taylor. He was succeeded by Louis Moss (1915-2000), who was Director from 1941 to 1970. Among its staff were Marie Jahoda and Ethel John Lindgren. The orientalist Margaret Smith worked for the Survey translating and writing texts for broadcasting in the Middle East and teaching Arabic to military personnel.
