= Barnet (constituency) =

Parliamentary constituency in the United Kingdom, 1945–1974

- Former county constituency for the House of Commons

1945–February 1974
- Seats: one
- Created from: St Albans
- Replaced by: Chipping Barnet and South Hertfordshire

First version of the seat. Result in 1945
Third and final version of the seat. Result in 1959

Barnet was a parliamentary constituency in what is now the London Borough of Barnet, which returned one Member of Parliament (MP) to the House of Commons of the Parliament of the United Kingdom.

== History and boundaries ==
The House of Commons (Redistribution of Seats) Act 1944 set up Boundaries Commissions to carry out periodic reviews of the distribution of parliamentary constituencies. It also authorised an initial review to subdivide abnormally large constituencies (those exceeding an electorate of 100,000) in time for the 1945 election. This was implemented by the Redistribution of Seats Order 1945 under which Hertfordshire was allocated an additional seat. As a consequence, the new County Constituency of Barnet was formed from the St Albans constituency, comprising the Urban Districts of Barnet and East Barnet, and the Rural District of Elstree.

For the 1950 general election, the Rural District of Hatfield was also added from St Albans, but from the 1955 general election, this was transferred back out to the Hertford constituency.

In 1965 the Barnet and East Barnet urban districts were transferred to Greater London, becoming part of the London Borough of Barnet, while Elstree Rural District remained part of Hertfordshire. This did not affect parliamentary boundaries for nine years, however.

When seats were next redistributed, with effect from the February 1974 general election, the Greater London parts of the old constituency moved to the new Borough Constituency of Chipping Barnet. The Elstree Rural District was transferred to the new County Constituency of South Hertfordshire.

== Members of Parliament ==
Election	Member	Party
1945	Stephen Taylor	Labour
1950	Reginald Maudling	Conservative
Feb 1974	constituency abolished	

== Elections ==
=== Election in the 1940s ===
General election 1945: Barnet
Party	Candidate	Votes	%	±%
Labour	Stephen Taylor	17,764	45.15	
Conservative	A.E.J. Clark	17,082	43.42	
Liberal	Jean Henderson	4,495	11.43	
Majority		682	1.73	
Turnout		39,341	73.76	
Labour win (new seat)				

=== Elections in the 1950s ===
General election 1950: Barnet
Party	Candidate	Votes	%	±%
Conservative	Reginald Maudling	32,953	53.31	+9.9
Labour	Stephen Taylor	22,419	36.27	−8.8
Liberal	William Herbert Jones	6,441	10.42	−1.0
Majority		10,534	17.04	
Turnout		61,813	87.45	
Conservative gain from Labour		Swing	+9.4	

General election 1951: Barnet
Party	Candidate	Votes	%	±%
Conservative	Reginald Maudling	35,527	56.97	
Labour Co-op	Cyril Rawlett Fenton	22,375	35.88	
Liberal	William Herbert Jones	4,463	7.22	
Majority		13,152	21.09	
Turnout		62,365	85.89	
Conservative hold		Swing		

General election 1955: Barnet
Party	Candidate	Votes	%	±%
Conservative	Reginald Maudling	30,299	60.76	
Labour	Sydney Hyam	19,570	39.24	
Majority		10,729	21.52	
Turnout		49,869		
Conservative hold		Swing		

General election 1959: Barnet
Party	Candidate	Votes	%	±%
Conservative	Reginald Maudling	33,136	62.67	
Labour	Reginald M Prideaux	19,737	37.33	
Majority		13,399	25.34	
Turnout		52,873		
Conservative hold		Swing		

=== Elections in the 1960s ===
General election 1964: Barnet
Party	Candidate	Votes	%	±%
Conservative	Reginald Maudling	25,537	48.43	
Labour	David H. P. Levy	17,024	32.28	
Liberal	Hugh Russell Tinker	10,172	19.29	New
Majority		8,513	16.15	
Turnout		52,733		
Conservative hold		Swing		

General election 1966: Barnet
Party	Candidate	Votes	%	±%
Conservative	Reginald Maudling	24,833	47.1	−1.3
Labour	Geoffrey Hickman	19,347	36.7	+4.4
Liberal	Hugh Russell Tinker	8,539	16.2	−3.1
Majority		5,486	10.4	−5.7
Turnout		52,719		
Conservative hold		Swing		

=== Election in the 1970s ===
General election 1970: Barnet
Party	Candidate	Votes	%	±%
Conservative	Reginald Maudling	26,845	52.29	
Labour	Joan E. M. Baker	18,166	35.38	
Liberal	John D. O. Henchley	6,329	12.33	
Majority		8,679	16.91	
Turnout		51,340		
Conservative hold		Swing		

== References and sources ==
Sources

- Boundaries of Parliamentary Constituencies 1885-1972, compiled and edited by F.W.S. Craig (Parliamentary Reference Publications 1972)
- Leigh Rayment's Historical List of MPs – Constituencies beginning with "B" (part 1)

Parliament of the United Kingdom
Preceded by Wirral	Constituency represented by the chancellor of the Exchequer; 1962–1964	Succeeded by Cardiff South East
