= Atif Khalil =

Islamic studies scholar

Atif Khalil is an Islamic studies scholar and associate professor of Religious Studies at the University of Lethbridge.

== Works ==
- Repentance and the Return to God: Tawba in Early Sufism (Albany: SUNY Press, 2018)
- In Search of the Lost Heart (Albany: SUNY Press, 2012)
- Mysticism and Ethics in Islam (Beirut: AUB Press, 2022)
