= Acceptable loss =

Military euphemism

An acceptable loss, also known as acceptable damage or acceptable casualties, is a military euphemism used to indicate casualties or destruction inflicted by the enemy that is considered minor or tolerable. In combat situations, leaders have to often choose between options where no one solution is perfect and all choices will lead to casualties or other costs to their own troops.

A small scale practical example might be when the advancement of troops is halted by a minefield. In many military operations, the speed of advancement is more important than the safety of troops. Thus, the minefield must be "breached" even if this means some casualties.

On a larger strategic level, there is a limit to how many casualties a nation's military or the public are willing to withstand when they go to war. For example, there is an ongoing debate on how the conceptions of acceptable losses affect how the United States conducts its military operations.

The concept of acceptable losses has also been adopted to business use, meaning taking necessary risks and the general costs of doing business, also covered with terms such as waste or shrinkage.

The euphemism is related to the concept of acceptable risk, which is used in many areas such as medicine and politics, to describe a situation where a course of action is taken because the expected benefits outweigh the potential hazards.

== See also ==
- Non-combatant casualty value
- Acceptability
- Risk assessment
- Collateral damage
- Distancing language
