= Ministry of Information (United Kingdom) =

United Kingdom government ministry

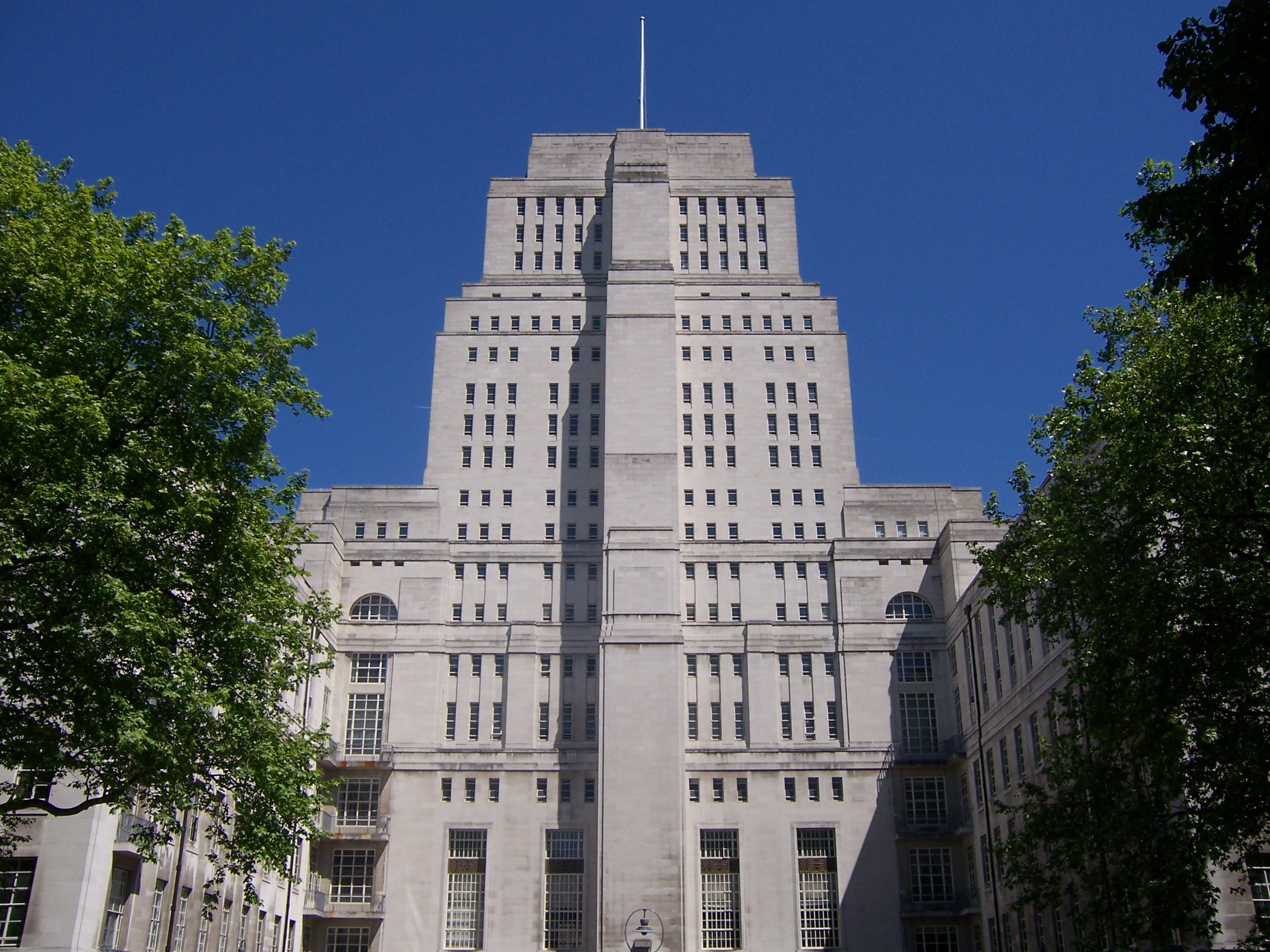
- Senate House, London, the Ministry of Information headquarters during World War II

Agency overview
- Formed: WWI: 10 February 1918; WWII: 4 September 1939
- Preceding agency: Department of Information
- Dissolved: WWI: 10 January 1919; WWII: 31 March 1946
- Superseding agency: Central Office of Information
- Parent agency: Prime Minister of the United Kingdom
- Child agencies: War Propaganda Bureau; Department of Propaganda in Enemy Countries; Press Bureau; Photographic & Cinematograph Deptartment; War Films Committee; Anglo-Russian Commission; Art Section / Visual Publicity Branch
- Key documents: Defence of the Realm Act; D-Notice

The Ministry of Information (MOI) was a United Kingdom government department created briefly at the end of the First World War and again during the Second World War. Located in Senate House at the University of London during the 1940s, it was the central government department responsible for publicity and propaganda. The MOI was dissolved in March 1946, with its residual functions passing to the Central Office of Information (COI); which was itself dissolved in December 2011 due to the reforming of the organisation of government communications.

== First World War ==
Before the Lloyd George War Cabinet was formed in 1917, there was no full centralised coordination of public information and censorship. Even under the War Cabinet, there were still many overlapping departments involved. The Admiralty, War Office and Press Committee (AWOPC) had been formed in 1912 as a purely advisory body, chaired initially by the Secretary of the Admiralty Sir Graham Greene, the press having agreed to self-censor accordingly in matters of defence and secret intelligence. When war was declared, other newly formed departments overlapped with it and with each other.

These included the British Board of Film Censors for films, the Propaganda Bureau for overseas information and propaganda (to counter the existing German equivalent), the National War Aims Committee for internal information and propaganda, the Neutral Press Committee dealing with neutral countries, and the Press Bureau (absorbing but not totally replacing many of the AWOPC functions and practices, albeit with much wider focus).

The Propaganda Bureau, situated in Wellington House and chaired by Charles Masterman, opened in 1914 and recruited 25 well-known authors for its work, including John Buchan, but in 1917 it was re-formed into the Department of Information under Buchan, with Masterman retaining responsibility for books, pamphlets, photographs and war paintings. Later that year that department was renamed as a ministry and placed initially under the then Minister without Portfolio, Sir Edward Carson, and subsequently in early 1918 under a senior press figure, Lord Beaverbrook. This was widely perceived and criticised, in politics and the press, as an excessive attempt by Lloyd George to control the press, as was political use of the Defence of the Realm Act 1914.

Wrangling between different interests continued for the remainder of the war and even afterwards, the Press Bureau becoming the main focus of discontent and negotiation between owners/editors and ministers. The Press Bureau did eventually in 1918 formulate guidelines for handling information in wartime, which were later used in 1938 in creating the Second World War Ministry of Information. Some forms of wartime censorship continued until 1920, by when the AWOPC became again the main interface for political/press publication of defence and secret intelligence matters.

=== Ministers of Information 1918–1919 ===
Colour key (for political parties):
Conservative Liberal

Name	Portrait	Term of office		Political party	Prime minister
Max Aitken, 1st Baron Beaverbrook		10 February 1918	4 November 1918	Conservative	David Lloyd George (Coalition)
William Hayes Fisher, 1st Baron Downham		4 November 1918	10 January 1919	Conservative	David Lloyd George (Coalition)

== Second World War ==
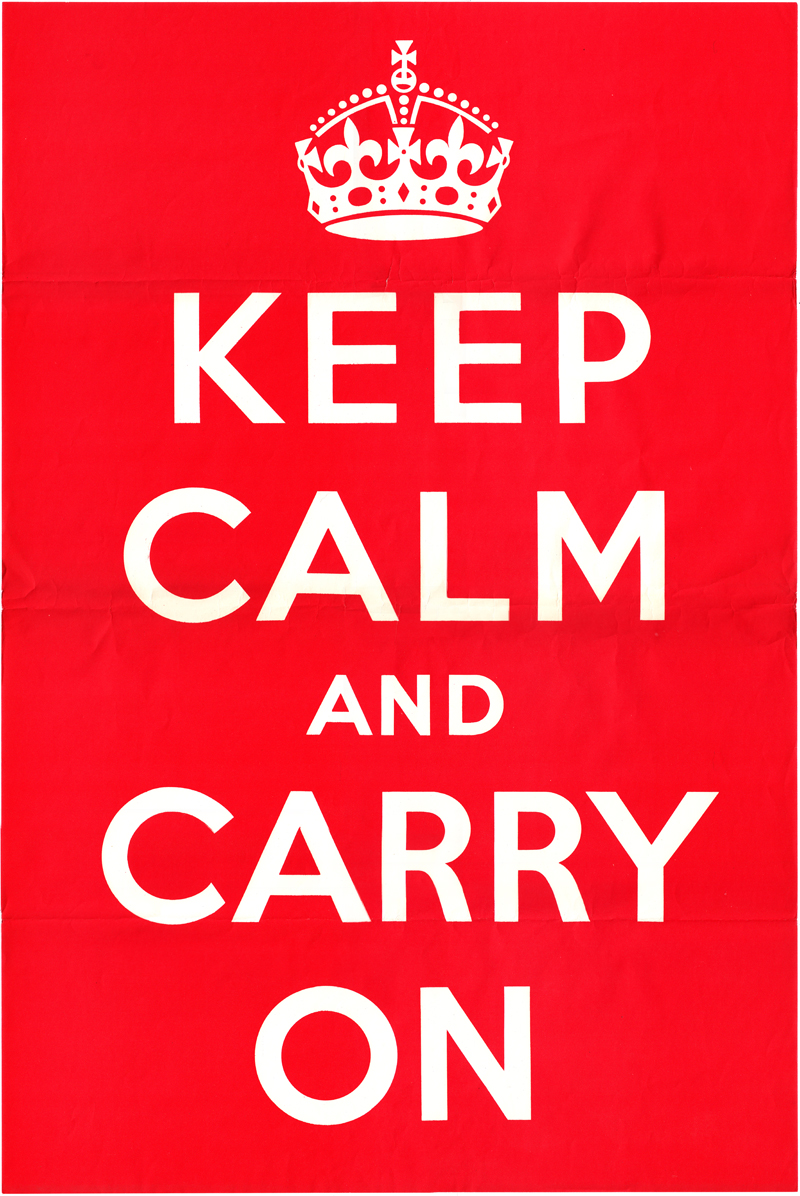
Keep Calm and Carry On, a poster produced by the MOI in 1939 which, although printed and distributed, was never posted.

The Ministry of Information (MOI) was formed on 4 September 1939, the day after Britain's declaration of war, and the first minister was appointed on 5 September 1939.

The ministry's function was "To promote the national case to the public at home and abroad in time of war" by issuing "National Propaganda" and controlling news and information. It was initially responsible for censorship, issuing official news, home publicity and overseas publicity in Allied and neutral countries. These functions were matched by a responsibility for monitoring public opinion through a network of regional information offices. Responsibility for publicity in enemy territories was organised by Department EH (later part of the Special Operations Executive).

=== Pre-War planning, 1935–38 ===
Secret planning for a Ministry of Information (MOI) had started in October 1935 under the auspices of the Committee of Imperial Defence (CID). Draft proposals were accepted on 27 July 1936 and Sir Stephen Tallents was appointed as Director General Designate. Tallents drew together a small group of planners from existing government departments, public bodies and specialist outside organisations.

The MOI's planners sought to combine experience gained during the First World War with new communications technology. Their work reflected an increasing concern that a future war would exert huge strain on the civilian population and a belief that government propaganda would be needed to maintain morale. However it was hindered by competing visions for the ministry, a requirement for secrecy which disrupted the making of key appointments, and the reluctance of many government departments to give up their public relations divisions to central control.

=== The Ministry of Information and the German occupation of Czechoslovakia, 1938–39 ===
The shadow Ministry of Information came into being briefly between 26 September and 3 October 1938 after the Nazi annexation of the Sudetenland (German occupation of Czechoslovakia) heightened international tensions. The 71 officials who were assembled in temporary accommodation had responsibility for censoring press reports surrounding the Munich Agreement.

The week-long experiment was not regarded as a success. Instead it highlighted the extent to which questions over appointments, accommodation, links to the media and the relationship with other government departments had been left unresolved. The confusion had been made worse by tensions between the shadow MOI and the Foreign Office News Department. This tension spilled over into the Committee for Imperial Defence which considered proposals to abandon plans for the Ministry of Information.

Tallents left his post as Director General Designate on 2 January 1939 (with responsibility for the MOI assumed by the Home Office). Planning efforts would increase again after Nazi troops moved into Prague on 15 March 1939 (German occupation of Czechoslovakia). The British Prime Minister Neville Chamberlain publicly announced his government's intentions for the MOI in a parliamentary speech on 15 June 1939. Home Office officials were privately given until 31 December 1939 to complete their plans.

=== The Phoney War, 1939–40 ===
The Ministry of Information (MOI) was formed on 4 September 1939, the day after Britain's declaration of war, and Lord Macmillan was sworn in as its first minister on 5 September 1939. The MOI's headquarters were housed within the University of London's Senate House and would remain there for the rest of the war.

The MOI was initially organised in four groups. A "Press Relations" group was responsible for both the issue of news and censorship. A "Publicity Users" group (split into "foreign" and "home" sections) was responsible for propaganda policy. A "Publicity Producers" group (split according to media) was responsible for design and production. These were overseen by a "Co-ordination and Intelligence" group responsible for administration. This structure had only been finalised in May–June 1940 and senior officials were often unsure about their responsibilities.

The press reacted negatively to the MOI. Initial confusion between the MOI and service departments led to accusations that the MOI was delaying access to the news, and a newspaper campaign against censorship was started. Other commentators pointed to the ministry's large staff and satirised it as ineffective and out of touch. The MOI's first publicity campaign also misfired with a poster bearing the message "Your Courage, Your Cheerfulness, Your Resolution, Will Bring Us Victory" criticised for appearing class-bound. These factors led to political scrutiny and resulted in the removal of the Press Relations Group on 9 October 1939 (which became an autonomous Press and Censorship Bureau) and an announcement on 25 October 1939 that the MOI's staff was to be cut by a third.

Lord Macmillan was replaced as minister by Sir John Reith on 5 January 1940. Reith sought to improve the MOI's governance, expanded its network of regional information offices and introduced a Home Intelligence division. He also sought to secure the reintegration of the Press and Censorship Division in the belief that the decision to separate this function had been "obviously and monstrously ridiculous and wrong". These changes were announced by Neville Chamberlain on 24 April 1940 but were not fully operational until June 1940.

=== The Battle of Britain, 1940 ===
Chamberlain's resignation and replacement by Winston Churchill on 10 May 1940 resulted in Reith being sacked and the appointment of Duff Cooper. Cooper was closely allied to Churchill and had openly criticised the previous government's approach.

Nazi advances in Western Europe encouraged the Ministry of Information (MOI) to increasingly focus on domestic propaganda after May 1940. A Home Publicity Emergency Committee was set up to issue public instructions about air raids, parachute raids and what to do in the event of an invasion. Concurrent campaigns extolled the public to "Avoid Rumour" and join a "Silent Column" so that they would avoid passing information to spies. However, as the situation stabilised, these campaigns were increasingly criticised for treating the public with contempt.

The MOI was subject to further criticism in July 1940 when it was accused of using "Gestapo" tactics to spy on the British public. Popular newspapers seized on reports about MOI-sponsored opinion polling and denounced the department's staff as "Cooper's Snoopers". Home Intelligence reports recorded complaints from those who felt that the British state was "becoming dangerously akin to the one we are fighting". The cost of such activities was also queried in Parliament.

Cooper was forced to confront further questions regarding the news and was dogged by accusations that he wanted to enforce a system of compulsory censorship. His failed attempt to increase the MOI's control over public relations divisions in other departments also drew him into conflict with Churchill. After two months of internal wrangling, it was reported that Cooper was to be replaced as Minister by Brendan Bracken on 17 July 1941.

=== Later stages of the War, 1941–45 ===
The Ministry of Information (MOI) settled down during Bracken's tenure. Supported by Churchill and the press, Bracken remained in office until after Victory in Europe Day.

One of Bracken's main achievements was to promote a closer working relationship with other government departments. Plans to increase control over public relations divisions in other departments were duly dropped and closer co-operation sought in their place. Bracken's experience as a newspaper proprietor encouraged a similar approach with regard to the press and he maintained that the MOI should not impinge upon the right to free speech.

Bracken was keen to promote a more limited role in the field of domestic propaganda. He insisted that the MOI should stop "lecturing" the public and publicly questioned its ability to "stimulate British Morale". The MOI was instead encouraged to provide background information to particular events whilst providing technical support to other departments. Bracken also insisted that the MOI should be dissolved at the end of the war with Germany and that its activities made it inappropriate to peacetime conditions.

=== Post War, 1945–46 ===
The MOI was dissolved in March 1946, with its residual functions passing to the Central Office of Information (COI), a central organisation providing common and specialist information services.

=== Campaigns ===
Campaigns carried out included themes such as the following:

- The Home Front
- Production – Salvage
- Allied Unity
- The Fighting Forces
- Personalities

=== Working practices ===
For home publicity, the ministry dealt with the planning of general government or interdepartmental information, and provided common services for public relations activities of other government departments. The Home Publicity division undertook three main types of campaigns: those requested by other government departments, specific regional campaigns, and those it initiated itself. Before undertaking a campaign, the MOI would ensure that propaganda was not being used as a substitute for other activities, including legislation.

The General Production Division (GPD), one of the few divisions to remain in place throughout the war, undertook technical work under Edwin Embleton. The GPD often produced work in as little as a week or a fortnight, when normal commercial practice was three months. Artists were not in a reserved occupation and were liable for call up for military service along with everyone else. Many were recalled from the services to work for the ministry in 1942, a year in which £4 million was spent on publicity, approximately a third more than in 1941. £120,000 of this was spent on posters, art and exhibitions. Of the many officially employed war artists, several, including Eric Kennington, Paul Nash and William Rothenstein, were war artists during both World Wars. Many extra designs were prepared to cope with short lead-times and the changing events of war. Through the Home intelligence Division, the MOI collected reactions to general wartime morale and, in some cases, specifically to publicity produced.

Dylan Thomas, frustrated at being declared unfit to join the armed forces, contacted Sir Kenneth Clark, director of the films division of the Ministry of Information, and offered his services. Although not directly employed by the MOI, he scripted at least five films in 1942 with titles such as This Is Colour (about dye); New Towns for Old; These Are the Men; Our Country (a sentimental tour of Britain), and The Art of Conversation.

=== Ministers of Information 1939–46 ===
Colour key (for political parties):
Conservative National Independent Labour

Name	Term of office		Political party	Prime minister
Hugh Macmillan, Baron Macmillan	4 September 1939	5 January 1940	Conservative	Neville Chamberlain (War Coalition)
Sir John Reith	5 January 1940	12 May 1940	National Independent	Neville Chamberlain (War Coalition)
Duff Cooper	12 May 1940	20 July 1941	Conservative	Winston Churchill (War Coalition)
Brendan Bracken	20 July 1941	25 May 1945	Conservative	Winston Churchill (War Coalition)
Geoffrey Lloyd	25 May 1945	26 July 1945	Conservative	Winston Churchill (Caretaker Min.)
Edward Williams	4 August 1945	31 March 1946	Labour	Clement Attlee

=== Current research ===
A major four-year Arts and Humanities Research Council (AHRC) funded research project on the "Communications History of the Ministry of Information" began in January 2014. The project is led by Professor Simon Eliot of the School of Advanced Study at the University of London and Paul Vetch of the Department of Digital Humanities at King's College London. A project website called MOI Digital was launched on 24 June 2014, see MOI Digital

Henry Irving and Judith Townend have drawn parallels between information censorship in Britain during World War II and contemporary restrictions in reporting trials that relate to terrorism offences, such as the case of R v Incedal and Rarmoul-Bouhadjar (2014).

=== The new book ===
Information at War, a communication history of the Ministry of Information, was published in June 2026, see Information at War - Simon Eliot, Henry Irving - Oxford University Press

== See also ==
- British War Memorials Committee
- Central Office of Information
- Disinformation Governance Board
- Information Research Department
- Ministry of Truth – Fictional version of the MOI in the novel Nineteen Eighty-Four
- Paper Salvage 1939–50
- Political Warfare Executive – British Second World War white and black propaganda unit
- Research, Information and Communications Unit
- War Artists' Advisory Committee
- Wartime Social Survey
