= Gunston Street =

American comic strip by Basil Vaviski

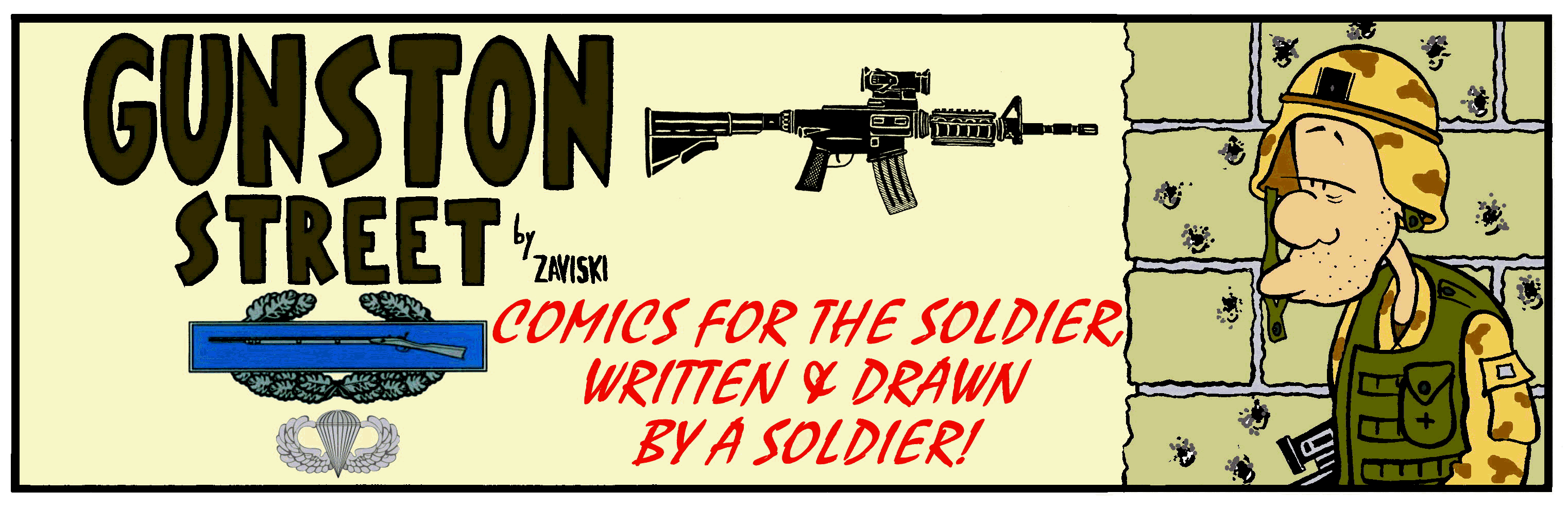
Gunston Street Comics are published weekly in the Stars and Stripes

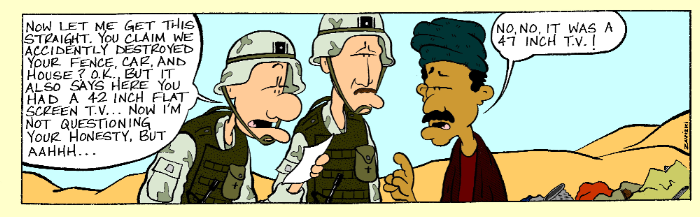
Gunston Street comic about collateral damage published in Stars and Stripes

Gunston Street is a weekly comic strip that is written and illustrated by Basil Zaviski. The main character Phil, is based on Basil's father Phillip Zaviski, who served with Basil in the same National Guard Unit for over 7 years. Although the main character is based on his father, the strips are that of Basil Zaviski's experiences. The heavy leaning storyline of the main character "Phil" tends to focus on the life and times of your average Army National Guardsman and their daily struggles with deployments, family and combat.

Basil Zaviski served over 15 years with the same National Guard unit, Co.F 425th Airborne Infantry (LRS) "Long Range Surveillance", and was deployed to Iraq for 15 months spanning 2004. The comic strip has been around since 1991, and has been reportedly rejected by syndicates for being niche, claiming that the average reader cannot connect with the military theme. Zaviski's reply,"That's fine with me. I see my job as giving the troops entertainment, not pleasing the syndicates. I enjoy what I do, and who I do it for."

== Publishers ==
- Stars and Stripes (? - Present)
- New Patriot EANGUS

== Video ==
- Recon Comic Relief
