= Michael A. Pirson =

German scholar and author

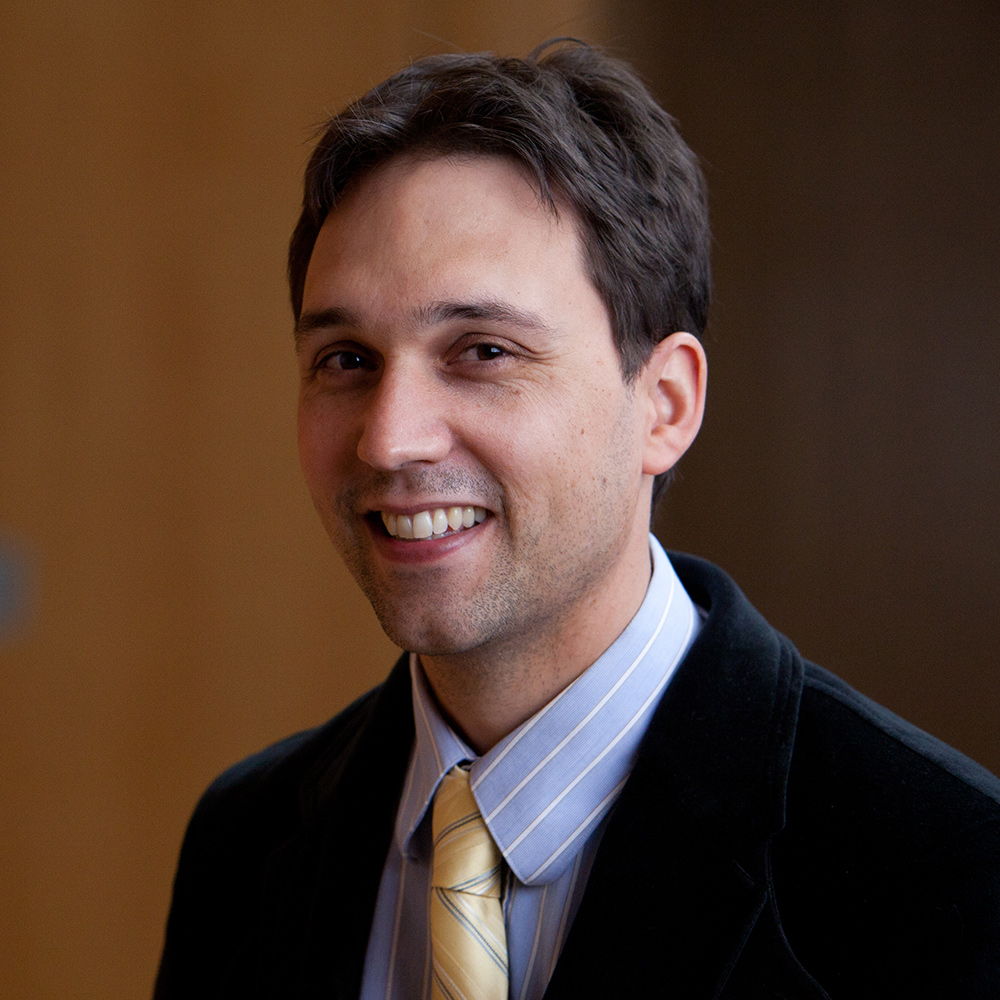
- Born: 1973 (age 52–53); Germany
- Occupations: Humanistic management scholar and author

Academic background
- Education: BA., Economics; MPA; MBA; PhD., Organizational Behavior
- Alma mater: University of Erlangen–Nuernberg; Institut d'études politiques de Strasbourg; Indiana University; University of St. Gallen (HSG); Harvard University

Academic work
- Institutions: Harvard University; Fordham University
- Website: https://michaelpirson.com/

Michael A. Pirson (born 1973) is a German humanistic management scholar and author. He is a professor and the James A.F. Stoner Endowed Chair in Global Sustainability and a professor of Global Sustainability and Social Entrepreneurship at Fordham University, while also being a Research Associate at Harvard University's Human Flourishing Program (HFP). He is the co-founder of the organizations Humanistic Management Network and the Humanistic Leadership Academy (HLA), Founder and President of the International Humanistic Management Association (IHMA), and leads the Humanistic Management working group at the United Nations Principles for Responsible Management Education (UNPRME).

Pirson is known for his research on humanistic management, psychological and social psychological work on individual differences in mindfulness, trust, and well-being, organizational analysis of corporate governance, stakeholder trust, and social innovation, and conceptual and philosophical study on freedom, dignity, and well-being, as he investigates the role of higher education in positive change-making and social innovation. He has authored and co-authored multiple research articles, a book titled Humanistic Management: Protecting Dignity and Promoting Well-Being, and edited and co-edited 10 books including Humanistic ethics in the Age of Globality, Banking with Integrity: The Winners of the Financial Crisis? and Case Studies in Social Entrepreneurship and Sustainability. He has received numerous awards such as the 2014 Academy of Management Best Paper Award, the 2018 Academy of Management Best Book Award, and the 2019 Association of Jesuit Universities Book Award.

Pirson is a full member of the Club of Rome and Editor-in-Chief of the Humanistic Management Journal.

== Education and early career ==
Pirson earned a Bachelor of Arts in economics from the University of Erlangen–Nuernberg in 1996, and later obtained a Master of Public Administration (Diplome de Sciences Po) from the Institute of Political Sciences, Strasbourg, France in 1997 and a Master of Business Administration from the University of Erlangen-Nuernberg and Indiana University in 1999. In 2005, he founded Humanet, a humanistic management research network, and is the Founder and President of the International Humanistic Management Association (IHMA). He received a Ph.D. in Organizational Behavior in 2007 from the University of St. Gallen, Switzerland, and in 2009, completed a post-doctoral fellowship in Organizational Behavior at Harvard University. Concurrently, he began his academic career as a lecturer at Harvard University Extension School from 2007 to 2010 and an assistant professor at Fordham University in 2008.

== Career ==
Pirson became an associate professor at Fordham University in 2013, and has been the full Professor for Global Sustainability and Social Entrepreneurship since 2020. He was appointed Distinguished Fellow at Case Western University from 2016 to 2018, and a Research Fellow at Harvard University Psychology Department from 2008 to 2018, where he serves as a Research Associate at Harvard University's Human Flourishing Program (HFP).

Pirson has been the James A.F. Stoner Endowed Chair in Global Sustainability at Fordham University since 2023.

Pirson was an Advisor to 3 NGO start-ups including CorpRate, Ibility, and Live it Adventure. In 2008, he was appointed Advisor to the 4th Sector Network to prepare proposals for policy change, and later to the OECD, Better Life Initiative. Additionally, he also worked as a Special Issue Editor for the Journal of Business Ethics, Human Systems Management and Business Ethics Quarterly, along with being an Editor of the Humanism in Business Series and the Humanistic Management Book Series. He is a member of the Wellbeing Economy Alliance Steering Committee, a Full Member of the Club of Rome, and the Editor-in-Chief of the Humanistic Management Journal.

== Awards and honors ==
- 2014 – Best Paper Award, Academy of Management
- 2018 – Best Book Award, Academy of Management
- 2019 – Book Award, Association of Jesuit Universities

== Bibliography ==
=== Selected books ===
- Case Studies in Social Entrepreneurship and Sustainability: The oikos collection Vol. 2 (2011) ISBN 9781906093471
- Humanistic Ethics in the Age of Globality (2011) ISBN 9780230273276
- Banking with Integrity: The Winners of the Financial Crisis? (2012) ISBN 9780230289956
- Humanistic Management: Protecting Dignity and Promoting Well-Being (2017) ISBN 9781316613719
- Dignity and the Organization (Humanism in Business Series) (2017) ISBN 9781137555618
- Love and Organization: Lessons of Love for Human Dignity, Leadership and Motivation (2022) ISBN 9781032183190

=== Selected articles ===
- Dierksmeier, C., & Pirson, M. (2009). Oikonomia versus chrematistike: Learning from Aristotle about the future orientation of business management. Journal of Business Ethics, 88, 417–430.
- Pirson, M. A., & Lawrence, P. R. (2010). Humanism in business–towards a paradigm shift?. Journal of business ethics, 93, 553–565.
- Pirson, M., & Malhotra, D. (2011). Foundations of organizational trust: What matters to different stakeholders?. Organization science, 22(4), 1087–1104.
- Pirson, M., & Turnbull, S. (2011). Corporate governance, risk management, and the financial crisis: An information processing view. Corporate Governance: An International Review, 19(5), 459–470.
- Pirson, M., Langer, E. J., Bodner, T., & Zilcha-Mano, S. (2012). The development and validation of the Langer mindfulness scale-enabling a socio-cognitive perspective of mindfulness in organizational contexts. Fordham University Schools of Business Research Paper.
- Pirson, M., Piedmont, R. L., Nagy, N., & Hicks, D. (2023). Establishing a Dignity Scale-Measuring Intrinsic Value within Social Contexts. Humanistic Management Journal, 1–16.
