= James Stoner =

James Stoner may refer to:

- James Reist Stoner Jr. (born 1955), professor of political science at Louisiana State University
- James A.F. Stoner (born 1935), professor of management at the Gabelli School of Business Administration of Fordham University
