= University of Erlangen–Nuremberg =

Public research university in Bavaria, Germany

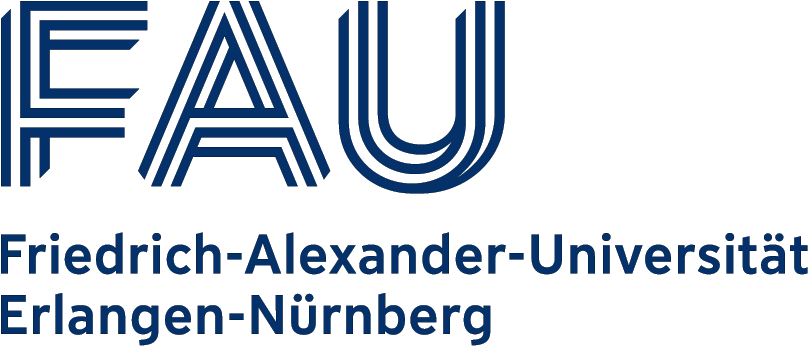
- Latin: Universitas Friderico-Alexandrina
- Former name: Friedrich-Alexander-Universität Erlangen
- Motto: Wissen bewegen
- Motto in English: Moving knowledge. FAU.
- Type: Public
- Established: 1742; 284 years ago (first); 4 November 1743 (moved)
- Founder: Frederick, Margrave of Brandenburg-Bayreuth
- Affiliations: Franco-German University, EELISA
- Budget: EUR 721.6 million Third party funding: EUR 300.35 million
- Chancellor: Christian Zens
- President: Joachim Hornegger
- Academic staff: 629 professors 3604 (other academic staff)
- Total staff: 6,723 (2025)
- Students: 40.996 (WS 2025/26)
- Location: Erlangen and Nuremberg, Bavaria, Germany; 49°35′52.5″N 11°0′17.17″E
- Campus: Urban
- Colors: Blue
- Website: fau.eu
- Location within Germany Location within Bavaria

The Friedrich-Alexander University of Erlangen–Nuremberg (German: Friedrich-Alexander-Universität Erlangen-Nürnberg, FAU) is a public research university in the cities of Erlangen and Nuremberg in Bavaria, Germany. The name Friedrich-Alexander is derived from the university's first founder Friedrich, Margrave of Brandenburg-Bayreuth, and its benefactor Alexander, Margrave of Brandenburg-Ansbach.

With around 40,000 students and over 275 degree programs in five faculties, FAU is one of the 15 largest universities in Germany. It is the third largest university in Bavaria. It was established in Bayreuth in 1742 and moved to Erlangen in 1743. FAU expanded to Nuremberg in 1961 and to Fürth in 2004. About two-thirds of students mainly use the campus in Erlangen and one-third use the one in Nuremberg.

In the winter semester of 2024/25, around 50 percent of the nearly 40,000 students were female, and around 9,200 came from abroad. As a comprehensive university, FAU offers a wide range of subjects across 272 degree programs, including 82 bachelor's degrees, 98 master's degrees, and 92 degrees leading to a state examination, such as teaching, law, or medicine (as of 2023). To reduce the risk of technology drain, the admission of scholarship holders from the China Scholarship Council (CSC) was initially suspended in 2023, but only temporarily. An exception is made for students who come to Germany with an additional scholarship from the German Academic Exchange Service (DAAD).

FAU is a member of the German Research Foundation DFG. Based on DFG funding, FAU has been one of the top ten universities in Germany for many years now. A total of 117.7 million euros in funding were approved in 2023. The university has seven DFG research groups and several graduate colleges. Due to numerous collaborations with other universities, colleges, and technical colleges in the region, Friedrich-Alexander University has outposts throughout northern Bavaria. The FAU Language Center enables students of all disciplines to obtain international language qualifications with UNIcert certification. FAU is a member of MedienCampus Bayern, the umbrella organization for media education and training in Bavaria.

== History ==
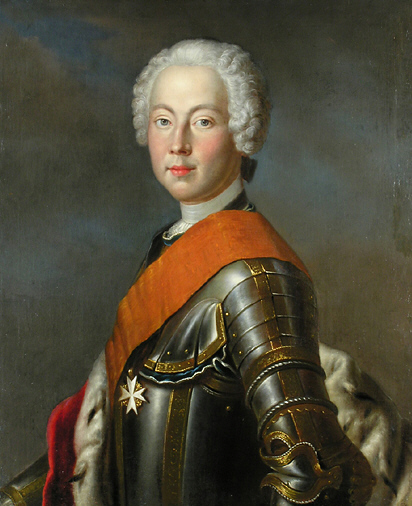
Frederick, Margrave of Brandenburg-Bayreuth, founder of FAU

=== 18th century ===
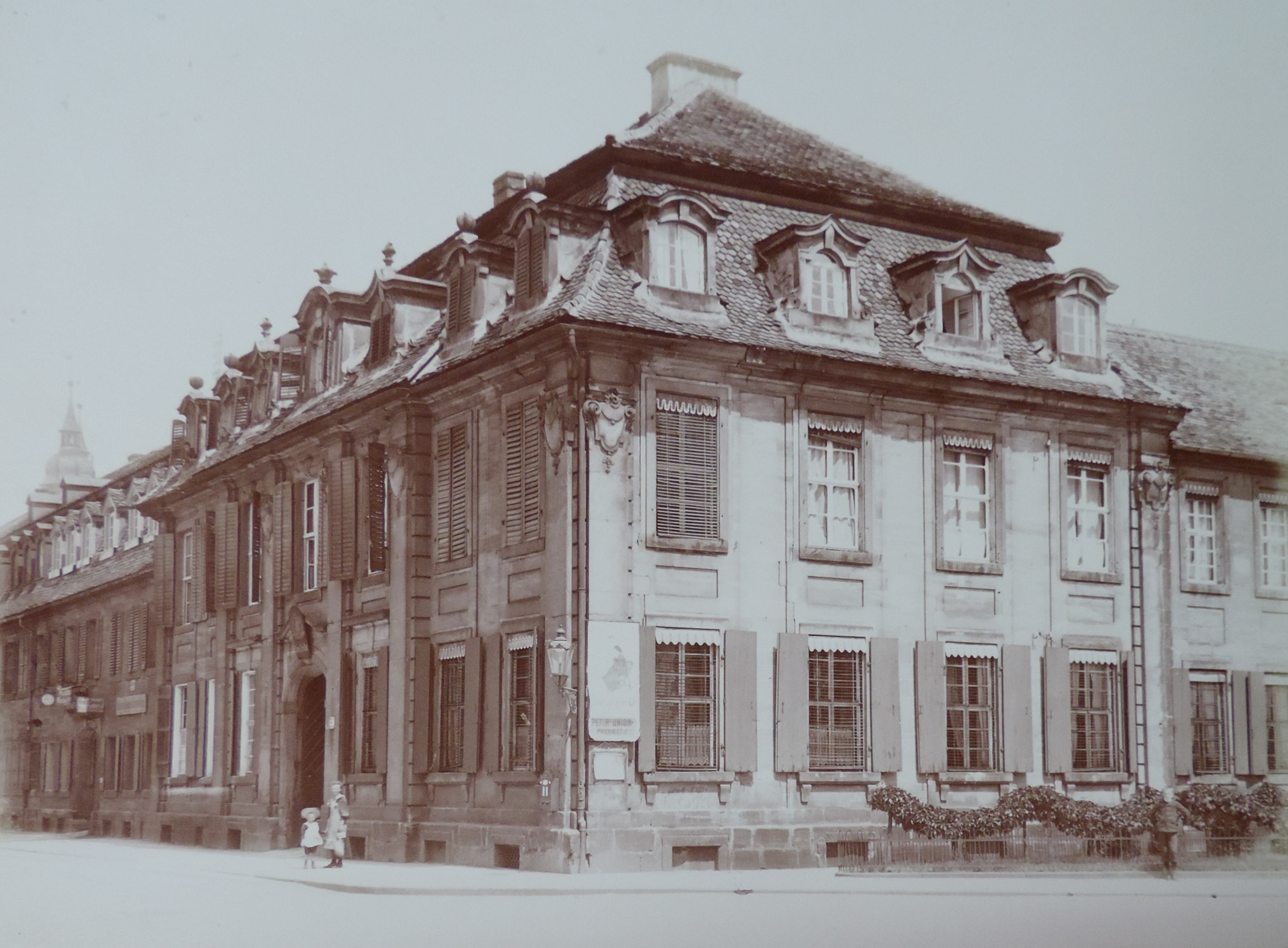
The Academia Fridericiana was founded in a former post office of the Holy Roman Empire in Bayreuth

The university was founded in 1742 as Academia Fridericiana in Bayreuth by Frederick, Margrave of Brandenburg-Bayreuth. On February 21, 1743, it was granted university status by Charles VII. Alongside the universities in Altdorf and Würzburg, Friedrich University was the third university in the Franconian region. In November 1743, it was relocated to Erlangen and housed in the premises of the former Knight Academy on Erlanger Hauptstraße. From the outset, the entire traditional range of subjects—theology, law, medicine, and philosophy—was taught, although the number of students in the early days remained consistently below 200. The first chancellor of the institution, which had only modest resources at its disposal, was the physician Daniel de Superville.

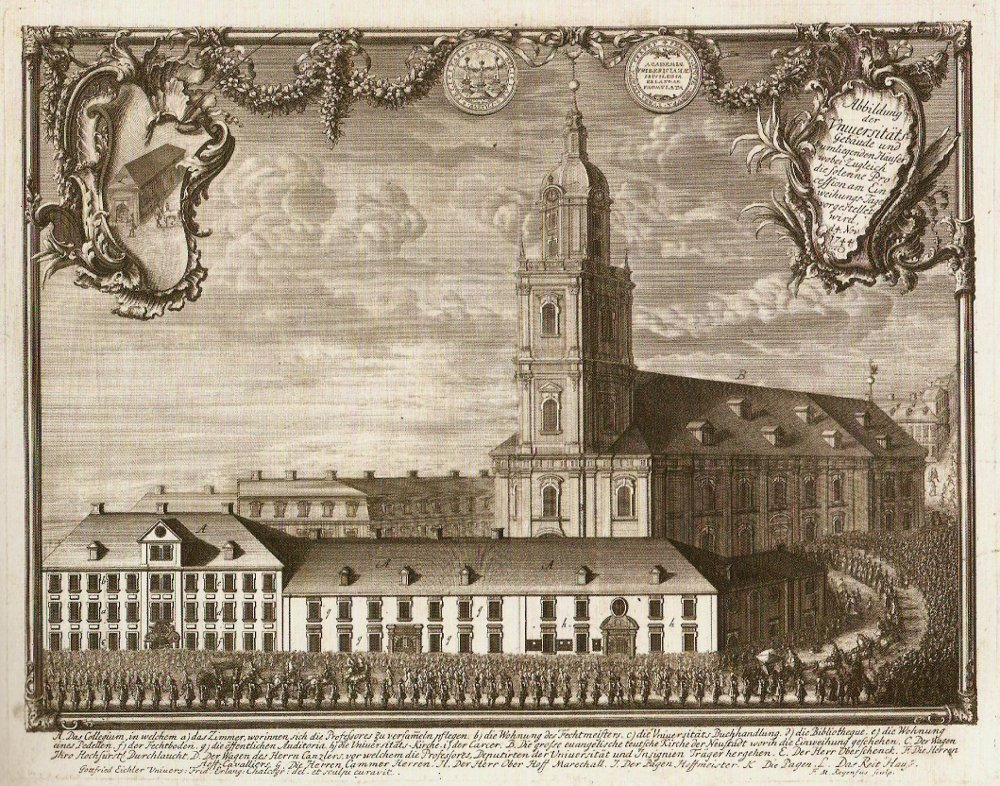
Idealized view of the inauguration parade of the University of Erlangen

In 1769, responsibility for the university fell to Christian Frederick Charles Alexander, Margrave of Brandenburg-Ansbach, who provided significant support to the early university and therefore became the university's second namesake. The Margrave of Ansbach-Bayreuth's privy councilor and Royal Prussian minister to the Franconian Circle, Karl Wilhelm, Baron Buirette von Oehlefeld (1724–1782), Lord of the Wilhelmsdorf Manor, bequeathed a foundation of over 20,000 guilders to the university in his will. As the arrangements for this had already been made with the Margrave, the latter awarded Buirette the highly coveted Grand Cross of the Order of the Red Eagle.

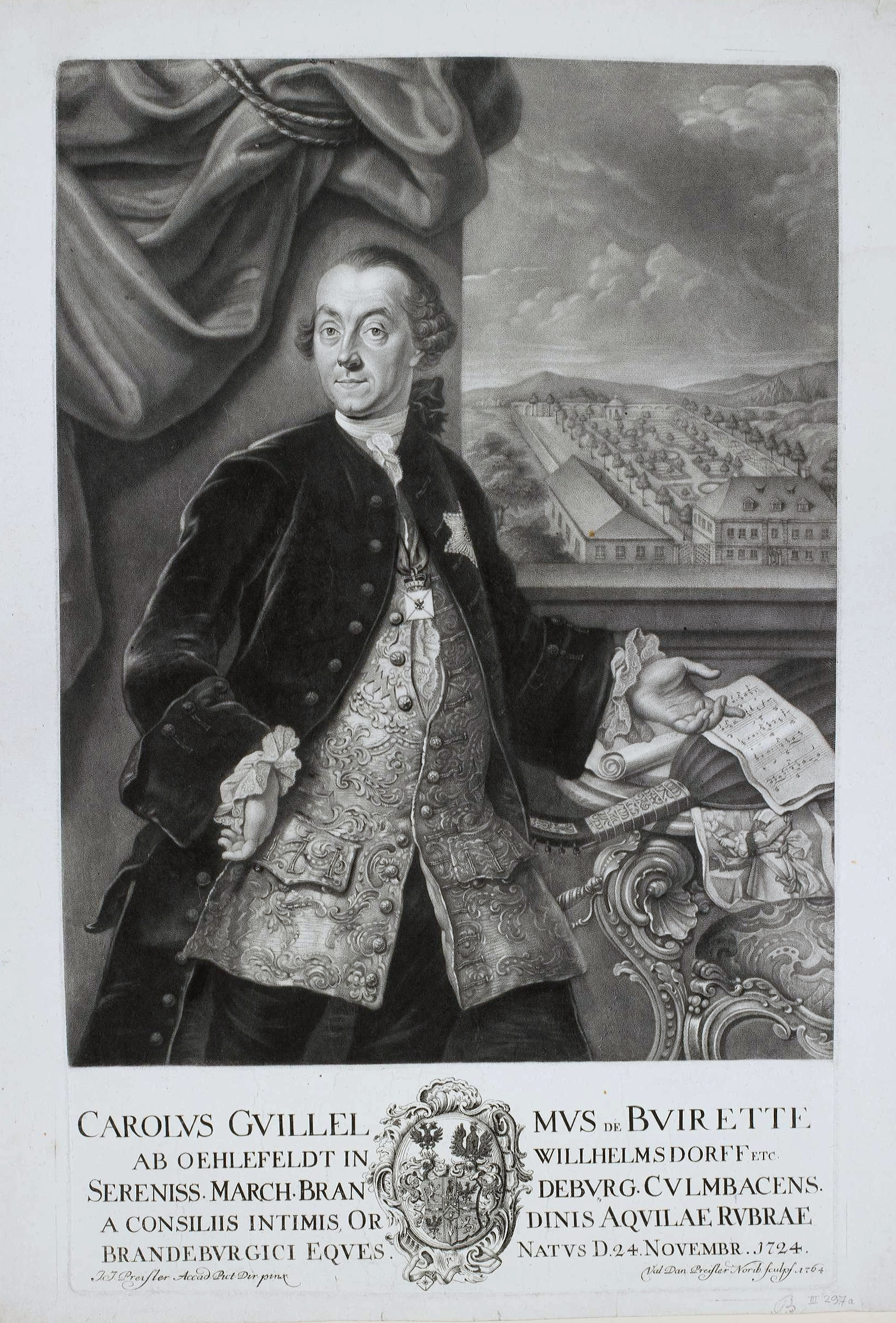
Karl Wilhelm Buirette von Oehlefeld, patron of the university, bearing the Grand Cross of the Order of the Red Eagle

=== 19th century ===
After the city of Erlangen was transferred to the Kingdom of Bavaria in 1810, the university only narrowly managed to avoid closure – unlike the University of Nuremberg in Altdorf – because it was the only Bavarian state university to have a Lutheran theological faculty going forward. It was therefore indispensable for the training of Protestant theologians in the new state. The university remained Lutheran for a long time, but gradually lost its original Lutheran confessional character.

Even today, the Friedrich-Alexander University has only a Protestant theological department and no Catholic theological department. However, it is still possible to study Catholic religious education for teaching at elementary, secondary, and vocational schools, as a subject in educational studies, and as an elective for business educators. For this purpose, there are four chairs at the Nuremberg campus, which now belong to the Faculty of Philosophy, to which the Department of Theology has been affiliated.

In 1818, the margrave's castle became the property of the university. After a long period of modest development, Erlangen University, like other German universities, experienced an upswing in the early 1880s. In this context, it is also worth mentioning the founding of the long-overdue History Seminar on behalf of King Maximilian II of Bavaria by the historian Karl Hegel, who had been working here since 1856 and who established modern historical studies at the University of Erlangen. After Hegel had served as vice-rector of the university in 1870/71, the department was founded in 1872. Karl Hegel remained director of the Department of History until 1884.

Student numbers rose in the 1880s from 374 at the end of the winter semester of 1869/70 to 1,000 in 1890. While law students were in the majority in the early years, the Faculty of Theology was the most popular at the beginning of the Bavarian period. It was not until 1890 that it was overtaken by the Faculty of Medicine. The number of full professors rose from 20 in 1796 to 42 in 1900, almost half of whom were employed by the Faculty of Philosophy, which also included the natural sciences. It was not until 1928 that the latter formed a separate faculty.

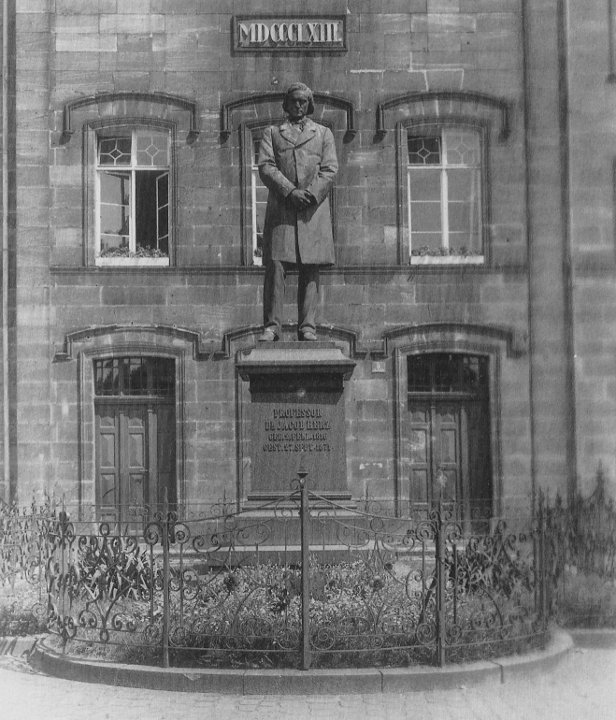
Jakob Herz monument on what was then Luitpoldplatz, around 1900

Jakob Herz became the first Jewish professor at a university in Bavaria in 1863. After his death, a monument was unveiled in his honor on May 6, 1875. The larger-than-life bronze statue, erected on what is now Hugenottenplatz, was removed after the National Socialists came to power and was presumably melted down for war purposes in 1944.

In 1897, the first women were admitted to study, and the first woman received her doctorate in 1904. From the second half of the 19th century onwards, several large university buildings were erected on the edges of the palace gardens, including the Kollegienhaus and the university hospital.

=== 20th century ===
Around 75% of the university's students volunteered or were conscripted during the First World War. 384 members of the university lost their lives in the war. In the post-war period, many of the students at Friedrich-Alexander University (around 350) took part in the suppression of the Bavarian Soviet Republic as members of the Freikorps Epp. As a result of the Bavarian Concordat (1924) with the Catholic Church, several Catholic "concordat chairs" still exist at the university to this day. In 1927, the natural sciences were separated from the Faculty of Philosophy and transferred to a joint Faculty of Natural Sciences.

==== Period of National Socialism ====
The National Socialist movement had already spread to the University of Erlangen in the early 1920s. An Erlangen Sturmabteilung (SA) division, consisting mainly of students, had been in existence since 1922. After Hitler's failed Beer Hall Putsch in Munich, a spontaneously formed radical nationalist list won twelve of 25 seats in the Erlangen AStA elections on 20 November 1923 and appointed Ludwig Franz Gengler as its first chairman. On 24 September 1924, 120 student members of the NSDAP founded the National Socialist Student Group Erlangen, which disbanded after Gengler moved to LMU Munich and was only re-established in 1928 as a university group of the National Socialist German Students' Union (NSDStB).

In the winter semester of 1928/29, the NSDStB won eight seats. In the subsequent university elections in 1929, the NSDStB finally won 14 seats, making the University of Erlangen the first German university to have a student parliament dominated by National Socialists. With around 200 members, the Erlangen university group had reached a considerable size by 1930 and was one of Baldur von Schirach's internal party opponents, led by the former Erlangen university group leader Reinhard Sunkel. After Sunkel and his supporters were expelled from the NSDStB, a splinter group of National Socialists called Revolutionary Students also ran in the university elections in Erlangen in November 1931 in competition with the Student Union and won a seat in the student parliament.

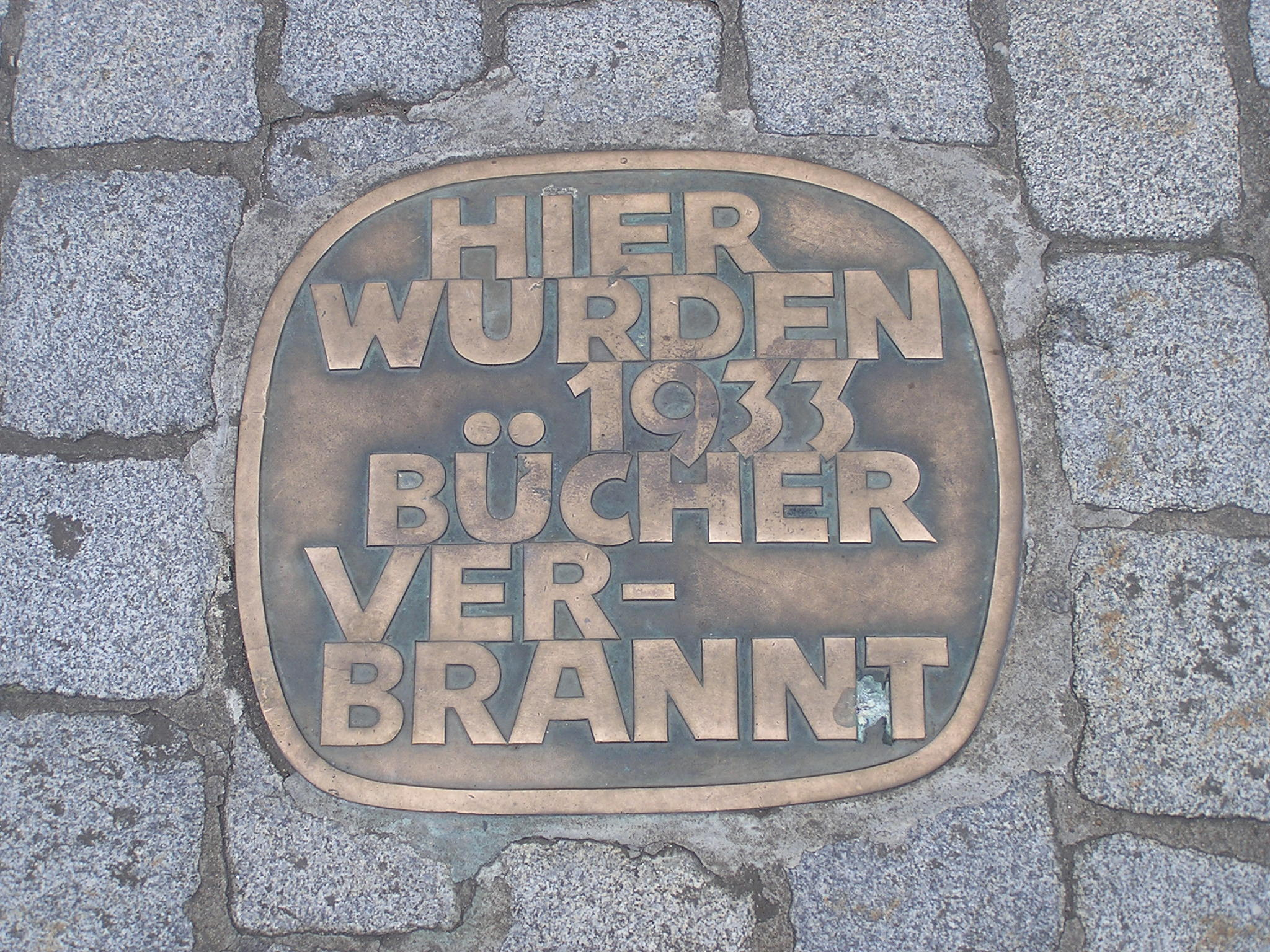
A plaque on Schlossplatz commemorates the Nazi book burnings

The University of Erlangen was less affected by the purge of German universities that began in 1933 than most other universities. Of the 121 members of the teaching staff in the winter semester of 1932/33, 9 people (7.4 percent) were expelled. However, 162 former students had their doctoral degrees revoked, mostly in 1939 (examples include the Jewish doctor Ernst Alfred Seckendorf and the lawyer and monarchist Catholic resistance fighter Adolf von Harnier). After the Second World War, the university denied this however, and it was not until the 1990s that this dark chapter of history was finally addressed.

==== Post-war period ====
The university survived the world wars relatively unscathed in terms of its buildings. The denazification process carried out by the American occupying forces led to the dismissal of numerous university teachers after the end of the war. They were replaced by professors from the former eastern territories, among others, which led to a shift from a predominantly Protestant teaching staff to a majority Catholic one. After the Second World War, some of the university's faculties reopened in January 1946 and teaching was gradually reestablished.

The post-war period led to further expansion, not only in terms of student numbers, but also in terms of the number of chairs. Above all, the collaboration with the parts of Siemens AG that had recently moved to Erlangen provided decisive impetus for further expansion and led, among other things, to the construction of the south campus for the technical and natural science faculties. In 1961, the Nuremberg University of Economics and Social Sciences, founded in 1919, was incorporated as a separate faculty, giving FAU its second major location and its current name, Friedrich-Alexander University of Erlangen–Nuremberg. The student revolt of the 1960s came to Erlangen with a slight delay and was significantly less intense. In 1966, a technical faculty was established. A new university complex was built in the south of Erlangen, which today combines engineering, computer science, inorganic chemistry, and an additional cafeteria in a concrete-dominated complex that is typical of the time. The Friedrich-Alexander University was thus one of the first classical universities to add a technical faculty to its range of subjects. In 1972, the Nuremberg College of Education was incorporated.

In December 1972, the university was the site of the University of Erlangen–Nuremberg shooting, in which two students were killed and thirteen other people were injured before the perpetrator set fire to the Zoological Institute, completely destroying the building.

In 1982, Erlangen University Hospital attracted national attention with the birth of Germany's first test-tube baby. Ten years later, there was a nationwide debate about the Erlanger baby, who was to be saved at Erlangen Hospital by life-support measures after its mother was declared brain dead following an accident. Since 1999, part of the new Erlangen district of "Röthelheimpark" has been used by the university ("Röthelheim Campus"). The site used to be an old artillery barracks built in 1900 and was later expanded with several buildings.

==== 21st century ====
In 2004, the decision was made to establish the Central Institute for New Materials and Process Technology (ZMP) in Fürth, making Fürth a "city of science" and another regional location for Friedrich-Alexander University. In July 2005, a new building for the chair of crystallography and structural physics was inaugurated at a cost of 5.8 million euros. On July 14, 2006, the newly founded Central Institute for Applied Ethics and Science Communication (ZIEW) was inaugurated.

As recently as 2007, FAU was divided into eleven faculties (listed in order of establishment): the Faculty of Theology, the Faculty of Law, the Faculty of Medicine, then the two Faculties of Philosophy I (Philosophy, History, and Social Sciences) and II (Linguistics and Literary Studies), three Faculties of Natural Sciences, including I (Mathematics and Physics), II (Biology, Chemistry, and Pharmacy), and III (Geography, Geology, Mineralogy, Paleontology), as well as the Faculty of Economics and Social Sciences in Nuremberg, the Faculty of Engineering and finally the Faculty of Education in Nuremberg. In 2007, the university was restructured as part of a structural reform: the previous faculties were merged to form five new large faculties. Three faculties lost their independence and became departments within the new faculties, including the Faculty of Theology, the Faculty of Education, and the Faculty of Economics and Social Sciences (the latter two located in Nuremberg). Theology is now an independent department within the Faculty of Philosophy.

Since 2008, the university has been part of the Bavarian Center for Political Theory (BAYPOL), whose Erlangen headquarters have provided FAU with another "research and competence center". In 2009, a chair for human rights ("Chair for Human Rights and Human Rights Policy") was established at the Institute for Political Science, enabling FAU to contribute to research and teaching in this important but academically rather weakly institutionalized field.

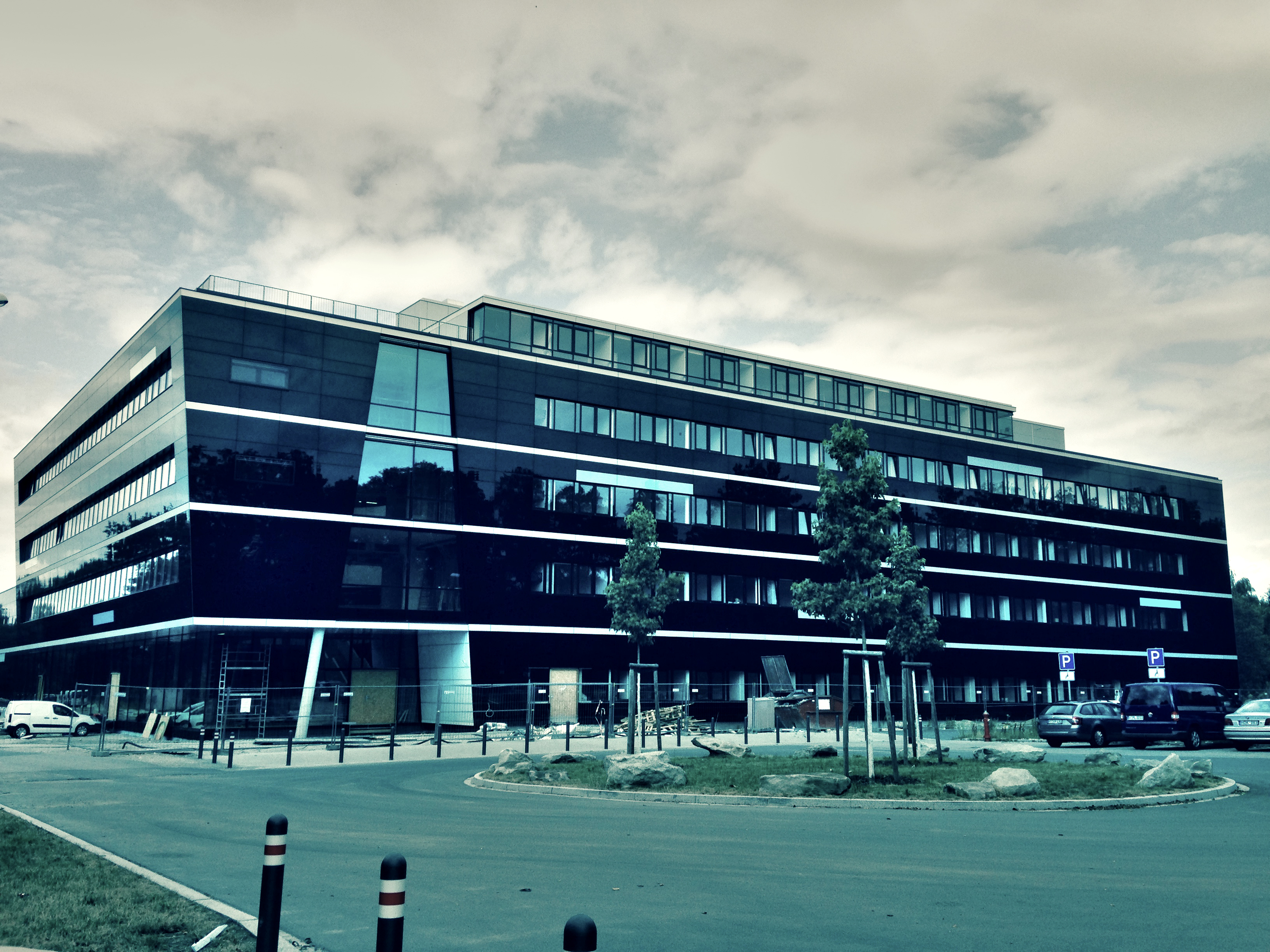
Max-Planck-Institute for the Science of Light in Erlangen

In 2009, the new Max Planck Institute for the Science of Light in Erlangen emerged from the Max Planck Research Group for Optics, Information, and Photonics, which was founded at the university for this purpose in 2004. Since then, it has hosted a large number of Max Planck Junior Research Groups and Alexander von Humboldt scholarship holders and, together with the Faculty of Engineering, has been involved in the two institutions of the Excellence Initiative established at the University of Erlangen–Nuremberg in 2004.

In April 2011, the university adopted a new logo in order to establish the commonly used abbreviation "FAU" as a trademark and build a corporate identity. The traditional seal depicting the two founders of the university will henceforth only be used in special contexts, such as on certificates and similar documents. From the outset, the design of the new logo was the subject of fierce criticism from various quarters. Students responded with satirical variations, some of which highlighted what they perceived as its excessive similarity to other well-known trademarks. There was also criticism that university members—both students and staff—were not sufficiently informed about or involved in this process, which is important for the university's identity.

In the wake of a significant nationwide increase in student numbers in the winter semester of 2011, the University of Erlangen–Nuremberg became one of Germany's twelve largest universities for the first time that year.

Since 2012, the Erlangen Graduate School in Advanced Optical Technologies has been bringing together the interdisciplinary fields of optics and photonics in the natural sciences and engineering at the MPI for the Science of Light, the Fraunhofer Institutes in Erlangen, and the Erlangen Research Focus Area for Medical Research.

==== Expansion in Erlangen ====
In mid-2013, age-related structural defects became apparent in various buildings belonging to Friedrich-Alexander University, particularly in the city center. According to the university management, these defects are due to years of underinvestment in building maintenance by the state government: For example, only around one-sixth of the funds required (5 of approximately 33 million euros) were received for necessary repairs and renovation measures on the buildings of the Faculty of Philosophy in 2012. Buildings belonging to other faculties are also in need of renovation, such as those belonging to the Department of Organic Chemistry and facilities on the south campus of FAU. The consequence of these years of delay in necessary construction measures was increasing deterioration in the condition of numerous university properties. In a seminar building of the Faculty of Philosophy, for example, large parts of the ceiling cladding fell onto the workplaces below in July 2013.

Not least due to the continuing poor condition of FAU's inner-city properties and the lack of space that has arisen over the last few decades, the university management and the Bavarian state government are planning to completely relocate and merge the Faculty of Philosophy (with its facilities in Nuremberg) into buildings belonging to Siemens in Erlangen city center. In particular, the group's former main administrative building in Erlangen known as the "Himbeerpalast" (Raspberry Palace), was the focus of attention in this context. The office building, with a total usable area of 46,000 m^{2}, would be ideal for this purpose, as it would provide the estimated 40,000 m^{2} of space required. In addition, a central humanities library could be created there to replace the numerous smaller university libraries. In September 2014, then Bavarian minister of culture Ludwig Spaenle, together with then Minister of Finance Markus Söder and then Minister of the Interior and Building Joachim Herrman, presented a new location concept for the university. This concept stipulated the relocation of the philosophy and education departments and the establishment of a central humanities library in the Himbeerpalast.

This location concept was revised in May 2017 to stipulate that educational sciences should remain in Nuremberg; however, the remaining departments of the Faculty of Philosophy were still to move to the Himbeerpalast by 2023. The reason for this was the announcement that Nuremberg would have its own technical university by 2030 and that the technical faculty of FAU would therefore remain in Erlangen. Finally, on July 3, 2018, the Bavarian cabinet decided at a meeting in Nuremberg on an investment package totaling 1.5 billion euros for the University of Erlangen, spread over 30 years, according to Minister President Markus Söder. Among other things, these funds are to be used to purchase the Himbeerpalast and convert it for the purposes of the planned humanities center. In addition to the renovation of the existing buildings, this will also require the construction of a new central humanities library in the inner courtyard and another new building in the immediate vicinity of the Himbeerpalast. In addition, the old Chemikum building on Henkestraße is to be converted into a lecture hall building for the philosophy faculty. The existing buildings of the Faculty of Philosophy in the north of Erlangen are to be demolished, with the exception of the Juridicum, to make way for the nearby University Hospital and the Faculty of Medicine.

The purchase by the Free State of Bavaria was completed on September 13, 2018, at the latest. Renovation and conversion of the building for the purposes of the Faculty of Philosophy were to take place from 2021, with the move scheduled for 2026/27. The renovation and expansion of the Himbeerpalast began on November 4, 2024. Accompanying the relocation of the Faculty of Philosophy to Werner-von-Siemens-Straße in Erlangen, the construction of a new central lecture hall building on Henkestraße is being considered. In addition, land on the Siemens Campus Erlangen was acquired by the State of Bavaria in 2023. The existing buildings on this land were first used by the central university administration and management of FAU from the end of 2024. A move was necessary because renovation of Erlangen Castle is planned during which the building will not be accessible. This opportunity was also used to consolidate the administration in a single building moving forward. Previously, it was spread across several locations in Erlangen

==== Expansion in Nuremberg ====
The campus of the Faculty of Philosophy for teacher training at FAU (known as the "Faculty of Education" from 1972 to 2007, and since then as the "Regensburger Straße Campus"), located in the south of Nuremberg, is home to both educational science subjects and humanities and social science subjects involved in teacher training. In 2020, the Bavarian state government decided that FAU should receive a new building in the north of the city for this purpose, which will be realized in the form of a public-private partnership project to accelerate the process. The public tender for the commissioned construction took place in 2021, and the process has now been completed. The new building complex was initially to be leased for at least 20 years. After this period, the Free State would have had an option to purchase. The university expected the new campus to be completed and handed over in 2026. The new building was planned at the intersection of Bucher Straße and Nordring in the north of Nuremberg and was to accommodate approximately 400 employees and up to 3,000 students. The site has been an industrial wasteland for many years and was to be redeveloped into a "campus-like green space". In 2024, the plans failed due to the insolvency of a project partner.

=== Timeline ===
Below is a short timeline of FAU from its inception to its present form:

- 1700–1704: The Schloss of the Margraves at Erlangen is built.
- 1743: Friedrich, Margrave of Brandenburg-Bayreuth, issues an edict whereby the Academia Fridericiana, founded by him in 1742 in Bayreuth, is transferred to Erlangen and renamed as a university, Universität Erlangen. It has the four faculties of Protestant Theology, Jurisprudence, Medicine and Philosophy.
- 1769: The Universität Erlangen is given the new name of Friedrich-Alexander-Universität in honour of Alexander, Margrave of Ansbach and Bayreuth.
- 1818: The library of the University of Altdorf, dissolved in 1809, is moved to Erlangen.
- 1824: The first hospital is built.
- 1825: The university moves into the Schloss.
- 1920: The WiSo Faculty (Business Administration, Economics & Social Sciences) is established.
- 1927: Science is taken out of the Faculty of Arts thus creating the new Faculty of Science.
- 1961: FAU acquires a further faculty through merger with the Nuremberg College of Economics and Social Sciences (founded in 1919). The university's name is now Friedrich-Alexander Universität Erlangen-Nürnberg.
- 1966: The Faculty of Engineering is established. (FAU is thus the first of the traditional universities of the old federal republic to incorporate engineering as an independent faculty.)
- 1972: The Teacher Training College in Nuremberg is incorporated into the Faculty of Education.
- 1993: FAU celebrates its 250th anniversary.
- 1994: The Free State of Bavaria purchases for the university 4.4 hectares of land in Erlangen previously owned by the US military. The area is now called Röthelheim Campus.
- 2000: The Bavaria-California Technology Centre opens its headquarters at the Friedrich-Alexander University of Erlangen-Nürnberg.
- 2000: Inauguration of the Research Centre in Clinical Molecular Biology in Erlangen.
- 2001: Opening of the Röthelheim Campus on the site of the old artillery barracks.
- 2004: Inauguration of the new building at the WiSo Faculty of Business Administration, Economics & Social Sciences in Nuremberg.

== "Erlangen Schools" and "Erlangen Program" ==
Erlangen School is a term used to describe various academic schools at the University of Erlangen and beyond. In the 19th century, Erlangen theology was already a well-known movement of revivalist lay people and theologians, such as Christian Krafft and Karl Georg von Raumer.

In his inaugural lecture in 1872, mathematician Felix Klein, son-in-law of historian and founder of the Historical Department at the University of Erlangen Karl Hegel, developed a mathematical-geometric concept called the Erlangen Program, a method of characterizing geometries based on group theory and projective geometry that is still relevant today.

The 20th-century philosophical school around the constructivists Paul Lorenzen and Wilhelm Kamlah is called Erlangen constructivism or constructivism of the "Erlangen School".

The Erlangen School of Information Psychology (20th century) deals with work in the field of intelligence research.

== Campuses ==
A major part of FAU's campuses is in the city of Erlangen, the minor part in the neighbouring city of Nuremberg. Several minor facilities are located in Hof, Fürth, Bamberg, Pleinfeld or Ingolstadt. In sum, there are several hundred FAU properties in the Nuremberg metropolitan area.

=== Erlangen ===
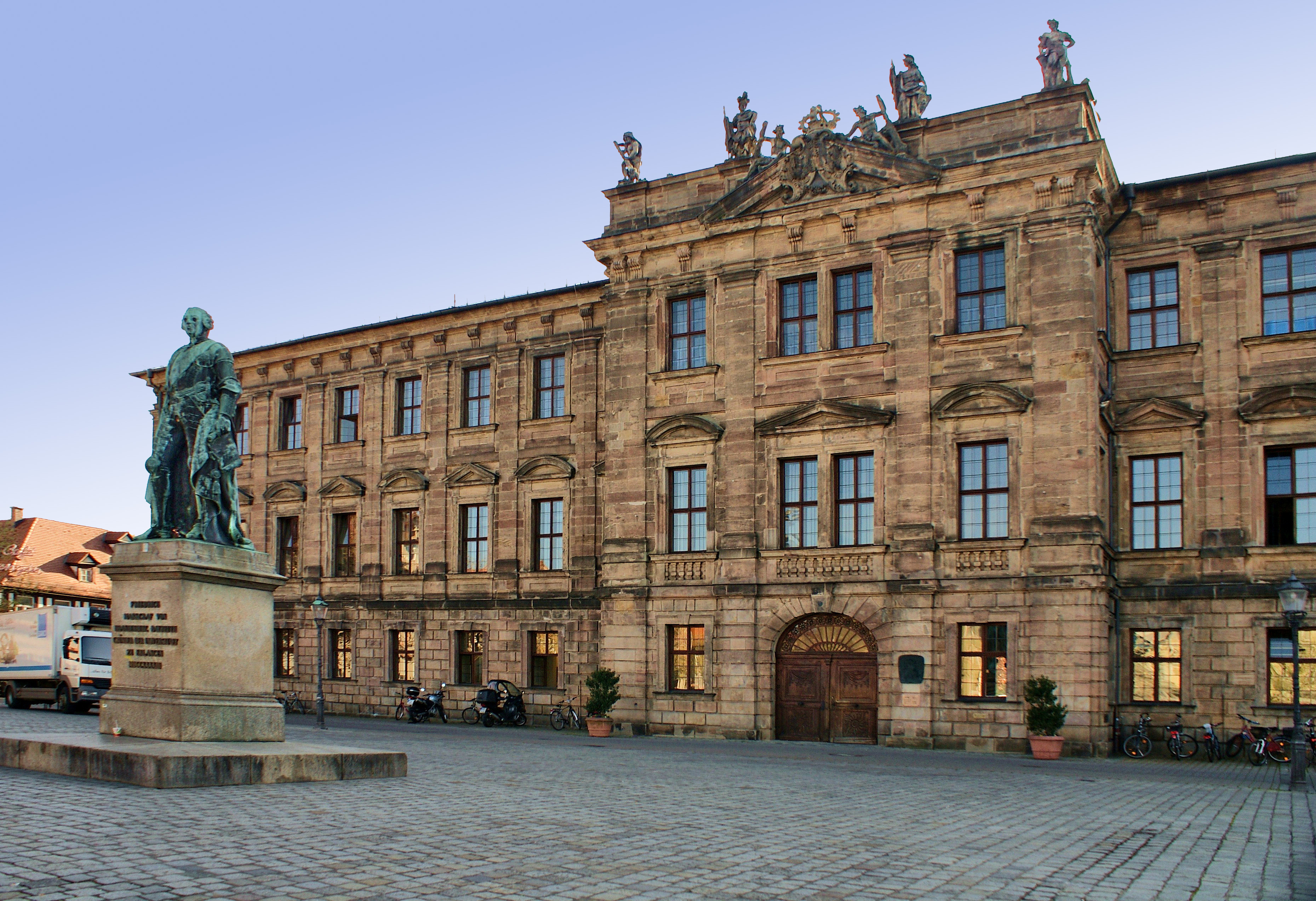
Schloss Erlangen

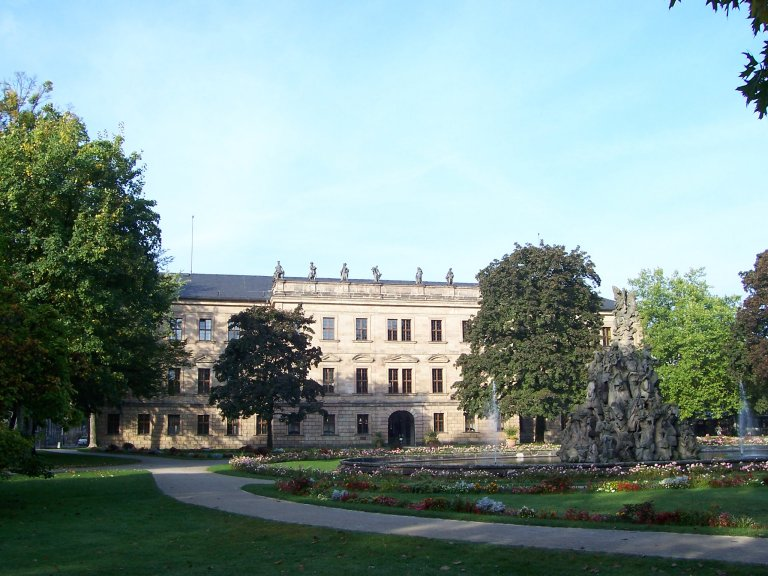
The castle in the center of Erlangen, known to many simply as the Schloss, is home to a large part of the university's administration

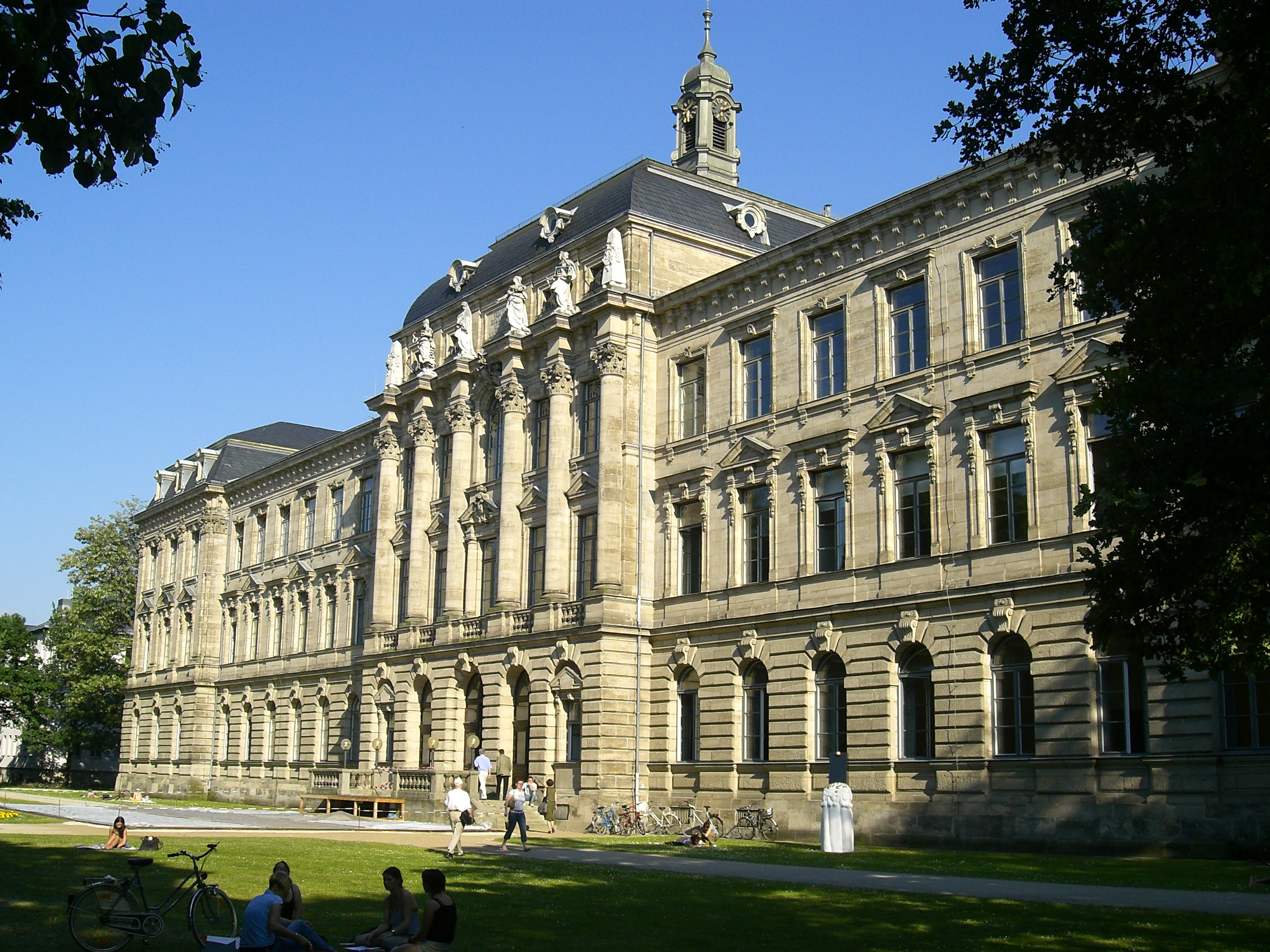
The Kollegienhaus, the historical central building and lecture hall of the university at the borders of the Schlossgarten

In Erlangen, the university has two main sites: one in the city centre (North site) and the other in city's south (South site). To the east of the city is the so-called "Röthelheim Campus" with minor engineering and medical facilities. In addition, FAU currently has a large number of larger and smaller properties spread over the entire Erlangen city area. Besides the Erlangen Schloss, the university's Schlossgarten in the city centre is a main sight in Erlangen and very popular among students especially during summer term.

The university's administration (in the Erlangen Schloss), the Faculty of Humanities, Social Sciences and Theology and the Department of Law (as part of the Faculty of Law and Economics) are located at the North Site (both at Bismarckstraße/Schillerstraße) as well as the Faculty of Medicine and the University Hospital. Also in the city centre is the University Library Erlangen-Nürnberg. The Erlangen University Hospital is one of the biggest university hospitals in Germany.

Logo of the University Hospital

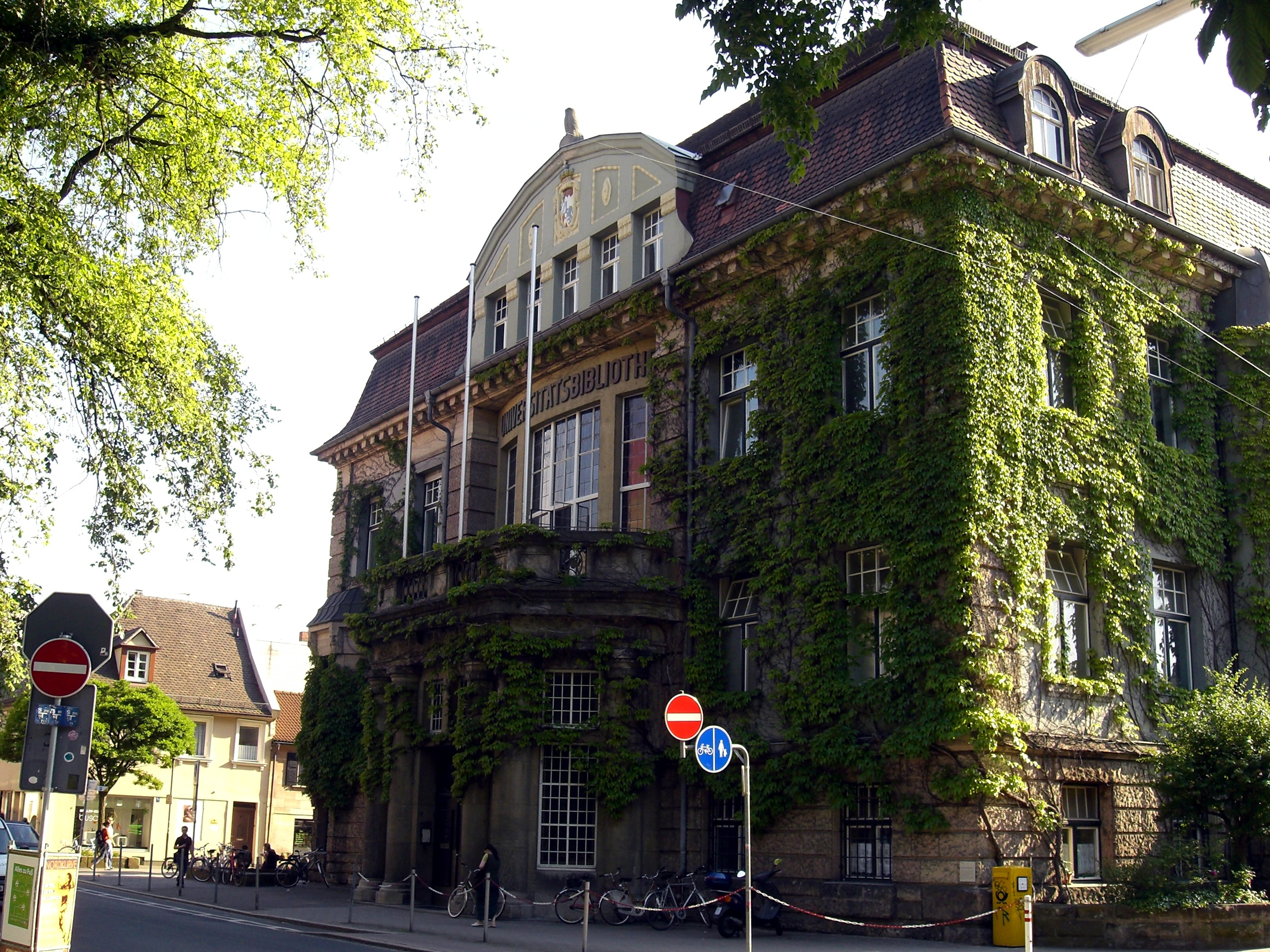
Old University Library (Erlangen)

The Faculty of Science (Erwin-Rommel-Straße/Staudtstraße) and the Faculty of Engineering form FAU's South site.

==== Library ====
The University Library Erlangen-Nürnberg is the library system of the Friedrich-Alexander University and is a regional library for the region of Middle Franconia. As an academic universal library, it offers its users a wide range of specialist literature from all faculties and a variety of services. With approximately 5.4 million volumes, it is Bavaria's largest library outside the state capital Munich. Large parts of the media stock are also accessible in interregional lending. The University Library is a member of the Bavarian Library Network (Bibliotheksverbund Bayern).

The Erlangen-Nuremberg library system is structured as a two-tier system, comprising four central libraries and 15 branch libraries. These libraries collectively manage a vast collection of resources distributed across approximately 200 locations. Among these central libraries, the Main Library and the Technical and Natural Sciences Branch Library (TNZB) are situated in Erlangen, while the Economic and Social Sciences Library (WSZB) and the Educational Science Branch Library (EZB) are based in Nuremberg.

Within this collaborative library system, most branch libraries take on the responsibility of acquiring and maintaining their own collections. However, all these resources are consolidated and accessible through the University Library's online catalogue, known as OPACplus.

=== Nuremberg ===
The Department of Economics (as part of the Faculty of Law and Economics) and the Department of Education (as part of the Faculty of Humanities) are in Nuremberg.

The Department of Economics is located northeast of the historic Old Town (Lange Gasse/Maxtormauer). The School of Business, Economics and Society in Lange Gasse, Nuremberg, celebrated 100 years in 2019. The Department of Education ("Campus Regensburger Straße") is in the southeast of the city near the Dutzendteich and the former Nazi party rally grounds of Nuremberg.

== Faculties ==
In February 2007, the senate of the university decided upon a restructuring into five faculties. Since October 2007, FAU consists of:

- Faculty of Humanities, Social Sciences, and Theology
- Faculty of Business, Economics, and Law
- Faculty of Medicine
- Faculty of Sciences
- Faculty of Engineering

The following faculties were part of the university (sorted in the order in which they were founded):

- Theological faculty
- Law faculty
- Medical faculty
- Philosophical faculty I (philosophy, history, and social sciences)
- Philosophical faculty II (languages and literature)
- Science faculty I (mathematics and physics)
- Science faculty II (biology, chemistry, and pharmaceutics)
- Science faculty III (geography, geology/mineralogy/paleontology)
- Business- and social sciences faculty (1961) in Nuremberg
- Technical Faculty (1966)
- Pedagogical faculty (1972) in Nuremberg

=== Faculty of Engineering ===
==== Inception ====
In 1962, after lengthy debate, the Bavarian parliament decided to establish a Faculty of Engineering in Erlangen. The Friedrich-Alexander University of Erlangen thus won against the city of Nuremberg, which, for decades, had been demanding the establishment of a college of engineering in Nuremberg. Since the expansive areas of building land required for this project were not available in the center of Erlangen, the foundations for a new university campus were laid in the south east of the town in 1964. The formal establishment of the Faculty of Engineering, then the seventh faculty at the university, took place in 1966. What was unique at the time was that the various engineering departments were subsumed, as a faculty, into the main university rather than constituting an independent university.

==== Present status ====
The Faculty of Engineering at FAU is a young educational and research institution. Since its foundation in 1966, the faculty has five departments and are as follows:

- Electrical, Electronic and Communication Engineering
- Chemical and Biological Engineering
- Materials Science and Engineering, which is according to the Quantitative Ranking of Engineering Disciplines, the 10th best worldwide.
- Mechanical Engineering
- Computer Science

The faculty has close connections both with other natural sciences and with traditional subjects at the university. The Faculty of Engineering currently concentrates on the following research fields:

- New Materials and Processes
- Life Science Engineering and Medicine Technology
- Energy Technology and Mobility
- Modeling and Simulation
- Optics and Optical Technologies
- Information- and Communication Technologies
- Micro-/Nano-electronics

== Facilities ==
Other university facilities:

- Bavarian Center for Political Theory (BAYPOL)
- Bavarian University Center for Latin America at Friedrich-Alexander University Erlangen-Nuremberg (BAYLAT)
- Campus media funklust
- Center for Continuing Education in Higher Education (FBZHL)
- Center for Teacher Training
- Central Institute for the Anthropology of Religion(s)
- Collegium Alexandrinum
- Erlangen Regional Computing Center
- FAU Alumni Network
- FAU Graduate School
- Language Center
- Studentenwerk (Student Services)
- University Hospital
- University Library
- University Orchestra

== Research ==
=== Major research areas ===
FAU claims leadership in a number of research topics. The current eight such major research areas are:

- Exploring the principles of nature
- Targeting environmental and economic challenges
- Understanding norms, cultural practices and social formations
- Developing future technologies
- Engineering transformative healthcare

=== Excellence Initiative ===
The Excellence Initiative is sponsored by the German federal and state governments to promote science and research at German universities. It aims to promote cutting-edge research and to strengthen higher education and research in Germany to improve its international competitiveness as well as making top performers in academia and science visible.

As part of this initiative, FAU has been awarded with funding for several Excellence clusters. The former Excellence Cluster Erlangen Graduate School in Advanced Optical Technologies (SAOT) received approximately 1.85 million euros of annual funding from 2006 to 2019. SAOT now acts as an interdisciplinary hub for research on photonics and optical technologies in Erlangen by providing an Education Program of Excellence for national and international doctoral candidates.

The former Cluster of Excellence 'Engineering of Advanced Materials and Processes' (EAM) was also established at FAU as part of the initiative and received a total of 70 million euros in funding from 2007 to 2019.

The contracts contributet significantly to the research funding of the university, including five new research buildings, permanent new technical facilities and research and teaching staff.

==== Cluster of Excellence "Transforming Human Rights" ====
The current federal excellence strategy aims to support 70 clusters of excellence at 43 German universities with a total budget of 687 millionen euros for the next seven years, a mid-seven-figure sum of which will go to the new Cluster of Excellence "Transforming Human Rights" at FAU. The funding provides institutional support for the Center for Human Rights Erlangen-Nuremberg. The Cluster of Excellence "Transforming Human Rights" aims to address the potential and the limits of human rights against the backdrop of the fundamental changes that are shaping our times.

The focus is on five megatrends:

- Autocratization
- The fragmentation of economic globalization
- International migration
- Ecological crisis across the planet
- Digital transformation

These megatrends are changing human rights standards, institutions and practices. At the same time, human rights themselves have the potential to provide answers to these five megatrends. Political scientist Kathrin Kinzelbach and legal expert Markus Krajewski are the co-spokespersons for the Cluster of Excellence.

=== National High Performance Computing Center ===
In 2020 FAU joined the National High-Performance Computing (NHR) alliance in Germany. This program is designed to provide researchers with access to state-of-the-art computing resources exceeding the limits of local HPC resources, including supercomputers. By joining the NHR program, FAU has expanded its computing infrastructure, enabling its researchers to conduct more advanced simulations and analyses in various fields of study.

=== Research institutions ===
==== Central institutions ====
Central institutions
- Cluster of Excellence 'Engineering of Advanced Materials' (EAM)
- Erlangen Graduate School in Advanced Optical Technologies
- Bavaria California Technology Center (BaCaTeC)
- Central Institute for Research on Teaching and Learning (ZiLL)
- Institute of Advanced Materials and Processes (ZMP)
- Center for Area Studies
- Center for Teacher Education
- Center for Applied Ethics and Science Communication
- FAU Graduate School
- Bavarian Academic Center for Latin America (BayLat)
- FAU Campus Busan
- Central Institute of Healthcare Engineering (ZIMT)
- Center ofor Scientific Computing (ZISC)
- Central Institute for Anthropology of Religion(s) (ZAR)

==== Interdisciplinary centers ====
Interdisciplinary centers
- Interdisciplinary Center for Digital Humanities and Social Sciences
- Interdisciplinary Center for Public Health
- Interdisciplinary Media Research Center
- Interdisciplinary Center for Islamic Religious Studies
- Interdisciplinary Center for Gerontology
- Interdisciplinary Center for Dialects and Language Variation (IZD)
- Interdisciplinary Center Old World
- Interdisciplinary Center for European Medieval and Renaissance Studies (IZEMIR)
- Interdisciplinary Center for Clinical Research (IZKF)
- Interdisciplinary Center Aesthetic Education
- Emmy-Noether Center for lgebra representation theory with emphasis
- Interdisciplinary Center Literature and Contemporary Culture
- Interdisciplinary Center Embedded Systems (ESI Embedded Systems Institute)
- Interdisciplinary Center for ophthalmic Preventive Medicine and Imaging
- Interdisciplinary Center Erlangen Catalysis Resource Center (ECRC)
- Interdisciplinary Center for Science Edition
- Interdisciplinary Center for Neurosciences (IZN)
- Interdisciplinary Center for Research on Lexicography, Valency and Collocation
- Interdisciplinary Center for Interface-Controlled Processes (IC-ICP)
- Erlangen Center of Plant Science (ECROPS)
- Interdisciplinary Center for Molecular Materials
- The Labor and Socio-Economic Research Center (LASER)
- Emil Fischer Center
- Medical Immunology Campus Erlangen (MICE)
- Erlangen Center for Infection Research (ECI)

==== Research centers and centers of excellence ====
Research centers & centers of excellence
- Engineering of Advanced Materials (Cluster of Excellence)
- Erlangen Graduate School in Advanced Optical Technologies
- Transfer Centre for Research and Development in Electronic Production (FOWEP)
- Cluster mechatronik & automation
- Bavarian Lasercenter (BLZ)
- Bavarian Center for Applied Energy Research (ZAE Bayern)
- Fraunhofer Institute for Integrated Circuits (IIS)
- Fraunhofer Institute for Integrated Systems and Device Technology (IISB)
- Research Association for Molded Interconnect Devices 3-D MID e.V.
- FAU Ingolstadt Institute
- Department of European Commercial Law
- Interdisciplinary Center for Clinical Research (IZKF)
- Center of Excellence New Materials

== Partnerships ==
FAU has contacts with approximately 500 universities all over the world, including many of the world's top universities like the University of Cambridge, Duke University, UCL, Imperial College London and many more.

=== Youth development ===
FAU is, together with HU Berlin, the university with the most graduate colleges funded by the German Research Foundation. Furthermore, FAU is a member of a large number of international, interregional and regional networks for promoting young researchers, such as the European Engineering Learning Innovation and Science Alliance (EELISA), the German University Association for the Qualification of Early-Career Researchers in Germany (UniWinD) and the Committee for the Promotion of Young Talent at Bavarian Universities (BayAK).

FAU has received several awards for its work with young researchers, including the Henriette Herz Prize from the Alexander von Humboldt Foundation for its FAUattract recruitment program. The FAUnext career program supports young researchers on their career path to becoming professors. In the Emerging Talents Initiative (FAUeti), young researchers can apply for internal university funding to further develop their research for the application process with external funding bodies such as the German Research Foundation. Furthermore, FAU supports its young scientists through various programs, including the ARIADNE program for the promotion of young female scientists, and a large number of collaborations with non-university institutions.

As a result, young scientists at the university have repeatedly been awarded prizes specifically tailored to young researchers, such as the Körber European Science Prize, the Alfried Krupp Prize, and the Heinz Maier Leibnitz Prize.

=== EELISA ===
Since 15.07.2021 FAU has been part of the European Engineering Learning Innovation and Science Alliance (EELISA). EELISA is a consortium of ten higher education institutions from France, Germany, Hungary, Italy, Romania, Spain, Switzerland and Turkey with the common ambition of defining and implementing a common model of European engineer rooted in society, and of bridging engineering, sciences and humanities for inclusive, sustainable and digital societies.

EELISA lists gender equity and diversity in engineering and science among its stated goals.

It's funded by the European Commission under the Erasmus+ program to transform European engineering education and co-funded by the European Union program Horizon2020 Funding for Research & Innovation and by the European Institute of Innovation & Technology. EELISA has been selected under the 2023 Erasmus+ European Universities Call with funding of €14,400,000 and a total budget of over €21,000,000 .

ELLISA members:

- Universidad Politécnica de Madrid
- Budapest University of Technology and Economics
- École nationale des ponts et chaussées
- Friedrich-Alexander University of Erlangen–Nuremberg
- Istanbul Technical University
- Scuola Normale Superiore
- Sant'Anna School of Advanced Studies
- Politehnica University of Bucharest
- Paris Sciences et Lettres University
- Zurich University of Applied Sciences/ZHAW

== Academic ranking ==
University rankings

Overall – Global & National
QS World 2026	232	14
THE World 2026	201–250	19–23
ARWU World 2026	226	15

According to the QS World University Rankings of 2026, the university is ranked 232th in the world and 14th nationally. The Times Higher Education World University Rankings for 2026 places the university at the 201–250th position globally, and 19–23rd at national level. As per the ARWU 2026 edition, the FAU is ranked 226th worldwide and 15th at the national level.

FAU ranks first in the "Industry, Innovation, and Infrastructure" sustainability goal of the Times Higher Education Sustainability Impact Ratings 2026. In the "Responsible Consumption and Production" sustainability goal, FAU ranks 29th globally and first in Germany. FAU is also among the top-ranked German universities in the sustainability goals "Good Health and Well-being," "Quality Education," "Affordable and Clean Energy," "Sustainable Cities and Communities," and "Climate Action."

The Academic Ranking of World Universities ranks the FAU 84th worldwide in Per Capita Performance.

Measured by the number of top managers in the German economy, FAU ranked 25th in 2019.

In 2017, ARWU ranked FAU 4th in Germany in Engineering/Technology and Computer Sciences, 6th in Germany in Clinical Medicine and Pharmacy and 7th in Germany in Natural Sciences and Mathematics.

QS World University Rankings 2018 ranked FAU as the academic institution that has produced the most widely cited publications in Germany (global 21st). 2017, Reuters ranked FAU as the 50th most innovative university globally (2nd Germany, 6th in Europe). In the Reuters ranking report published in 2019, FAU has been rated as the most innovative university in Germany and as the 2nd in Europe.

In Academic Ranking of World Universities for year 2014, FAU ranked second among German universities in Engineering/Technology and Computer Sciences group for all four ranking parameters TOP, FUN, HiCi and PUB.

== Awards ==
=== Alexander von Humboldt Professorships ===
In 2010, the newly announced professor of physics and co-director of the Max Planck Institute for the Science of Light, Prof. Vahid Sandoghdar was awarded an Alexander von Humboldt Professorship, Germany's highest-endowed international research award, endowed with €3.5 million. In the year 2011, the second in a row, FAU communications engineer and researcher Prof. Dr.-Ing Robert Schober (born 1971) was awarded an Alexander von Humboldt Professorship, entailed with €3.5 million, for an algorithm developed by him which is found in many modern phones today. In 2013, Prof. Oskar Painter received an Alexander von Humboldt Professorship as well. Prof. Painter is another new co-director of the Max Planck Institute for the Science of Light. In 2019, Prof. Enrique Zuazua received an Alexander von Humboldt Professorship where he directs the chair for dynamics, control, machine learning, and numerics.

The Alexander von Humboldt Foundation has honored each professor nominated by FAU with the prestigious award since 2018. Linguist Ewa Dąbrowska received the award in 2018. She conducts research in cognitive linguistics and is currently setting up a Linguistics Lab at FAU. In 2019, mathematician Enrique Zuazua, who conducts research in partial differential equations and control theory at the Department of Data Science, followed suit. Kristian Franze, who studies the mechanics of the nervous system, was awarded the Humboldt Professorship in 2020. He is also a member and team leader of the Max Planck Center for Physics and Medicine, which was founded by FAU together with Erlangen University Hospital and the Max Planck Institute for the Science of Light. The following year mathematician and sinologist Andrea Bréard received the Humboldt Professorship. Vincent C. Müller, who researches the ethics and philosophy of artificial intelligence, followed suit in 2022. In 2023, physicist Benoit Ladoux was honoured with the award. He is researching how cells and tissues generate mechanical forces, how they react to these forces, and how these stresses in turn influence the changes of shapes, migration, and differentiation of cells during their development. The 2024 recipient was Michaela Mahlberg, who uses computer-assisted quantitative linguistic methods to examine language and its social function in huge text corpora. Also nominated in 2024 was Eva Pils, who got the award in 2025 for her research on human rights protection in China.

=== Comprehensive Cancer Center ===
As part of their funding program for the initiation and further development of centers of excellence in cancer care, the university hospitals of Würzburg, Erlangen, Regensburg, and Augsburg (CCC WERA) and the university hospitals of Leipzig and Jena (CCCG) have joined forces to form so-called Comprehensive Cancer Centers (CCC). CCC WERA and CCCG will receive a total of €11 million in funding from German Cancer Aid for four years starting in 2022.

=== CONKO-007 study on pancreatic cancer ===
In a clinical study led by the Radiation Oncology Department at Erlangen University Hospital, researchers were able to show how long-term survival can be improved for certain pancreatic cancer patients. The study showed that the additional therapy had a positive impact on long-term survival. The five-year survival rate for all patients included in the study was significantly higher after radiochemotherapy (10 percent) than after chemotherapy alone (3.8 percent). The study was funded by the German Cancer Aid Foundation with 1.9 million euros. The foundation has also set up a funding program to establish a research alliance to combat pancreatic cancer. The aim is to improve treatment options for those affected. The German Cancer Aid Foundation has allocated €40 million Euro for this program for a funding period of five years. The funded projects are expected to be announced at the German Cancer Congress in February 2026.

== Events ==
=== Schlossgartenfest ===
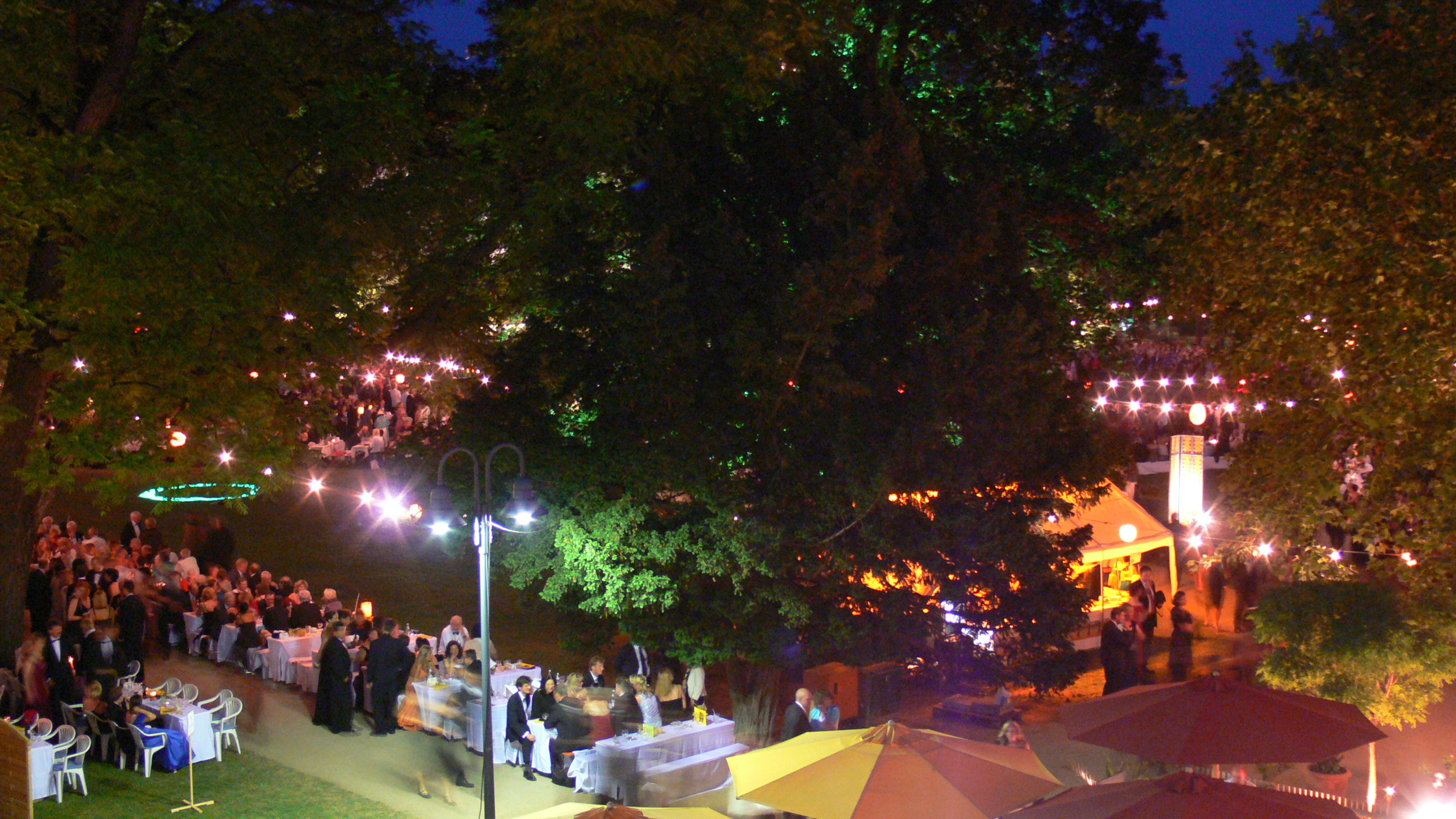
The Schlossgartenfest by night

Since 1951, the university has held the so-called Schlossgartenfest (Castle Garden Festival) every year in June/July. The festival is considered a social highlight in Bavaria's academic calendar. With around 6,000 participants, it is one of the largest garden parties in Europe. As part of the preparations, the castle gardens in the center of Erlangen are transformed into a large open-air ballroom, boasting several dance floors, fairy lights, sound systems, seating, and catering for the guests. The atmosphere is enhanced by annually changing light objects and the colorful illumination of the surrounding buildings. These are created each year by design students from Coburg University. The festivities used to include fireworks. In 2022, a laser show took place for the first time instead of fireworks. Since 1974, a so-called Bürgerfrühschoppen (citizens' morning pint) has taken place on the following Sunday. During the event, students and professors from the university meet with Bavaria's economic and political dignitaries.

In 1969, the Schlossgartenfest had to be cancelled due to student unrest, in 1966, 1980 and 2000 due to persistent bad weather, and in 2020 and 2021 due to the COVID-19 pandemic.

=== Dies academicus ===
Every year on November 4, the university celebrates its academic birthday, the dies academicus (lat.: academic day). Traditionally the university president starts the event by giving family members, friends, and supporters of FAU a review of the most important events and developments of the past year and an outlook on the university's plans and projects for the coming year. Attended by important figures from public life, this day also sees the presentation of honors and awards of outstanding importance to the university – at FAU, for example, the title of honorary senator, the title of FAU ambassador, or the equality award. In addition to the official ceremony, the Dies academicus at FAU is an opportunity for members, friends, and supporters of the university to engage in conversation with one another.

== Points of interest ==
- Botanischer Garten Erlangen, the university's botanical garden

== Notable alumni and professors ==
- Louis Agassiz, biologist and geologist
- Johann Christian Daniel von Schreber (1739–1810), naturalist, studied mammals.
- Robley Dunglison (1798–1869), personal physician to Thomas Jefferson, considered the "Father of American Physiology"
- Samuel Hahnemann (1755–1843), founder of homeopathy
- Alexander von Humboldt (1769–1859), Geographer and Explorer, attended lectures in Chemistry and Physics.
- Friedrich Rückert (1788–1866), orientalist and poet.
- Georg Simon Ohm (1789–1854), physicist, Ohm's law, named after him.
- Justus von Liebig (1803–1873), chemist, "father of the fertilizer industry".
- Ludwig Andreas Feuerbach (1804–1872), philosopher, associated with the Young Hegelians, an atheist.
- Karl von Hegel (1813–1901), historian, father-in-law to Felix Klein and son of the philosopher Hegel
- Felix Klein (1849–1925), Mathematician
- Hermann Emil Fischer (1852–1919), chemist, Nobel Prize in Chemistry 1902
- Eduard Buchner (1860–1917), chemist, Nobel Prize in Chemistry 1907
- Emanuel Lasker (1868–1941), world chess champion, mathematician, philosopher.
- Emmy Noether (1882–1935), mathematician, Noether's theorem, named after her.
- Hans Geiger (1882–1945), physicist, Geiger counter
- Ludwig Erhard (1897–1977), Chancellor of Germany 1963–1966
- Otto Friedrich Ranke (1899–1959), physiologist
- Ethelbert Stauffer (1902–1979), Professor of New Testament Studies
- Wolf-Dieter Montag (1924–2018), German physician, and international sports administrator
- Alma Adamkienė (1927–), First Lady of Lithuania 1998–2009
- Johanna Narten (1930–2019), historical linguist and first woman member of the Bavarian Academy of Sciences and Humanities
- Harald zur Hausen (1936–), virologist, Nobel Prize in Physiology or Medicine 2008
- Heinrich von Pierer (1941–), former CEO of Siemens AG (1992–2005).
- Karlheinz Brandenburg (1954–), audio engineer, developer of the MP3 audio codec.
- Burkard Polster (1965–), mathematician, host of YouTube channel Mathologer.
- Anatole Romaniuk (1924–2018), demographer
- Naser Sahiti (born 1966), mechanical engineer and elected Rector of the University of Prishtina
- Philipp Plein (born 1978), founder in the Philipp Plein brand
- Julia Lang (entrepreneur) (born 1989), serial entrepreneur and founder of VEERT
- Michael A. Pirson (born 1973), the James A.F. Stoner Endowed Chair in Global Sustainability and a professor of Global Sustainability and Social Entrepreneurship at Fordham University
- Eberhard Wagner, German linguist and author
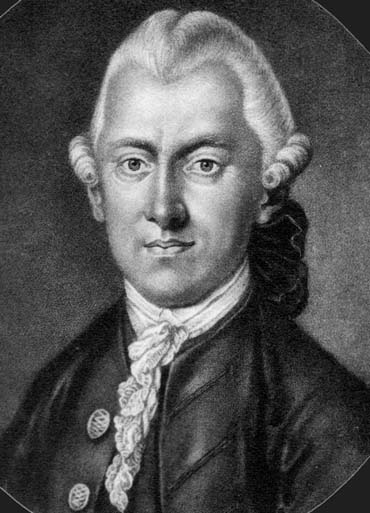
Johann Christian Daniel von Schreber

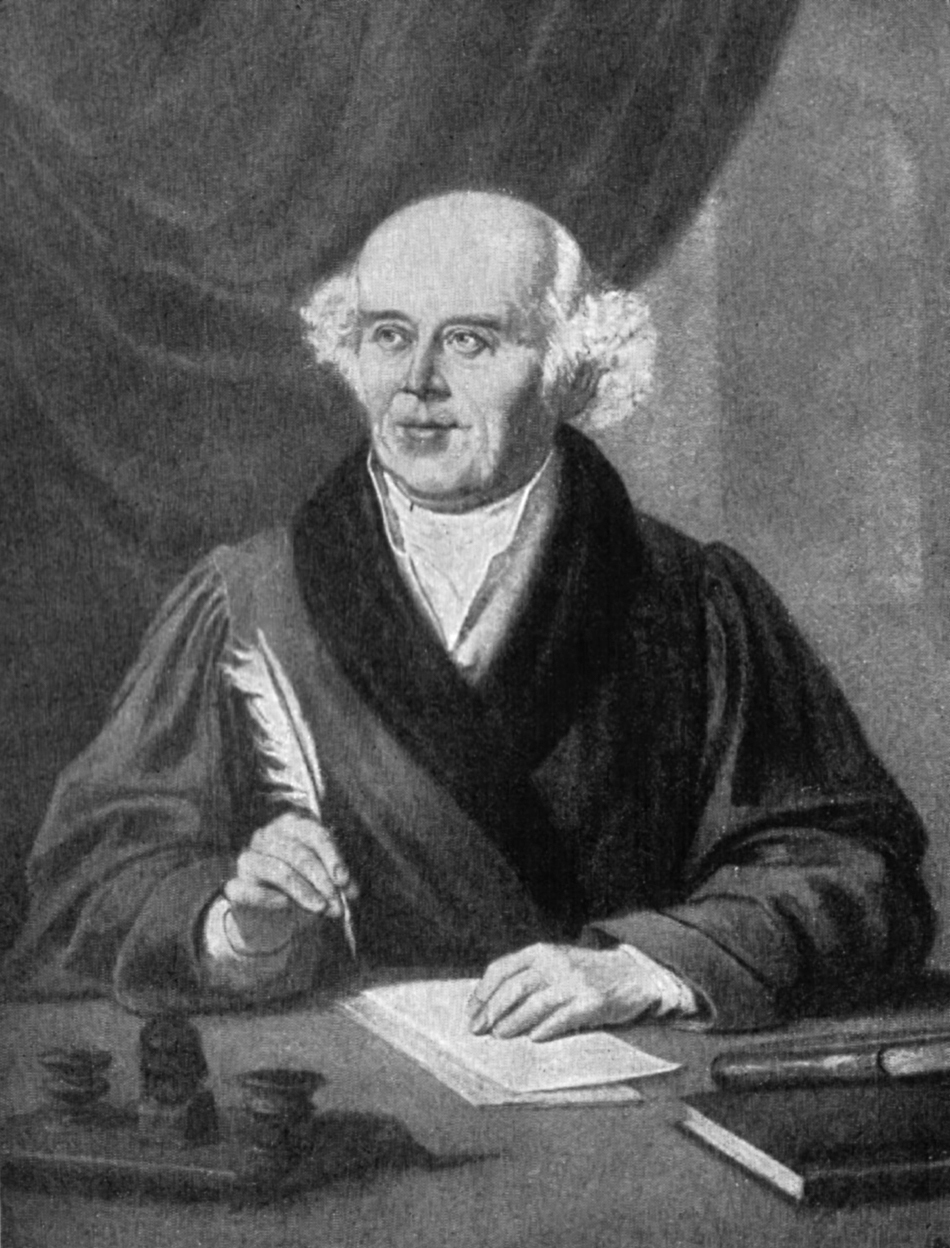
Samuel Hahnemann

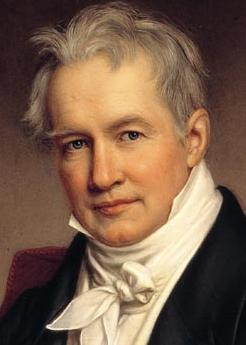
Alexander von Humboldt

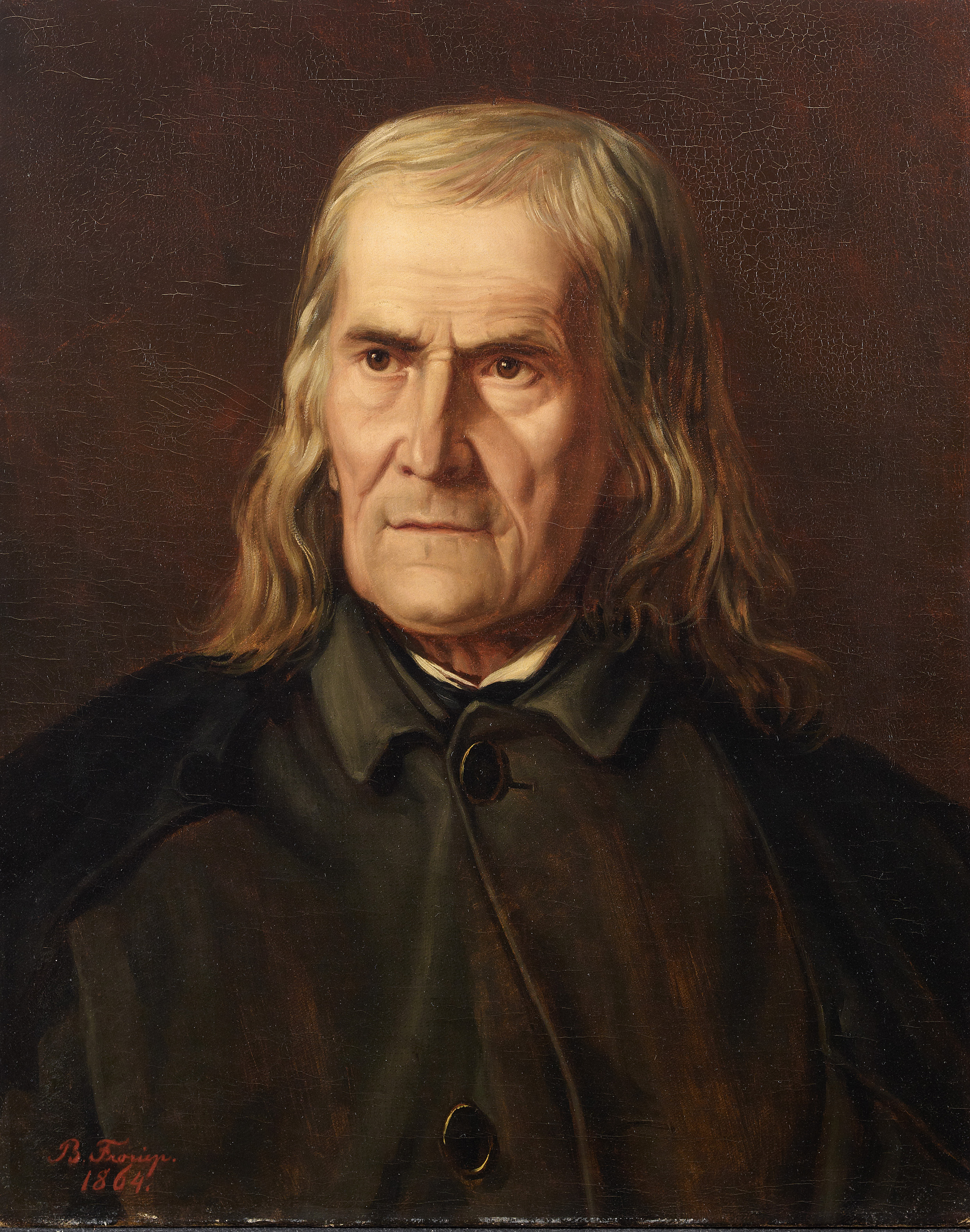
Friedrich Rückert

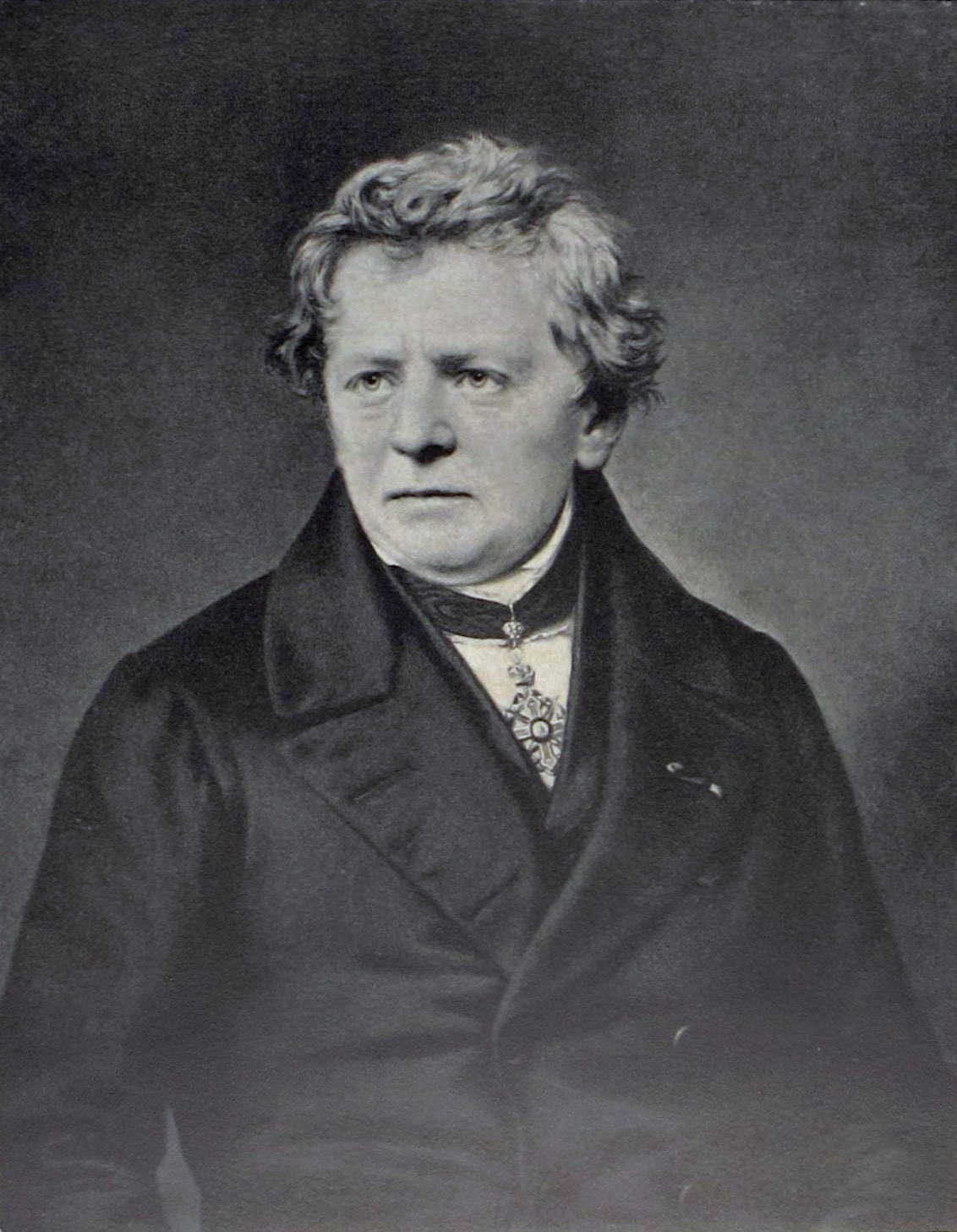
Georg Simon Ohm

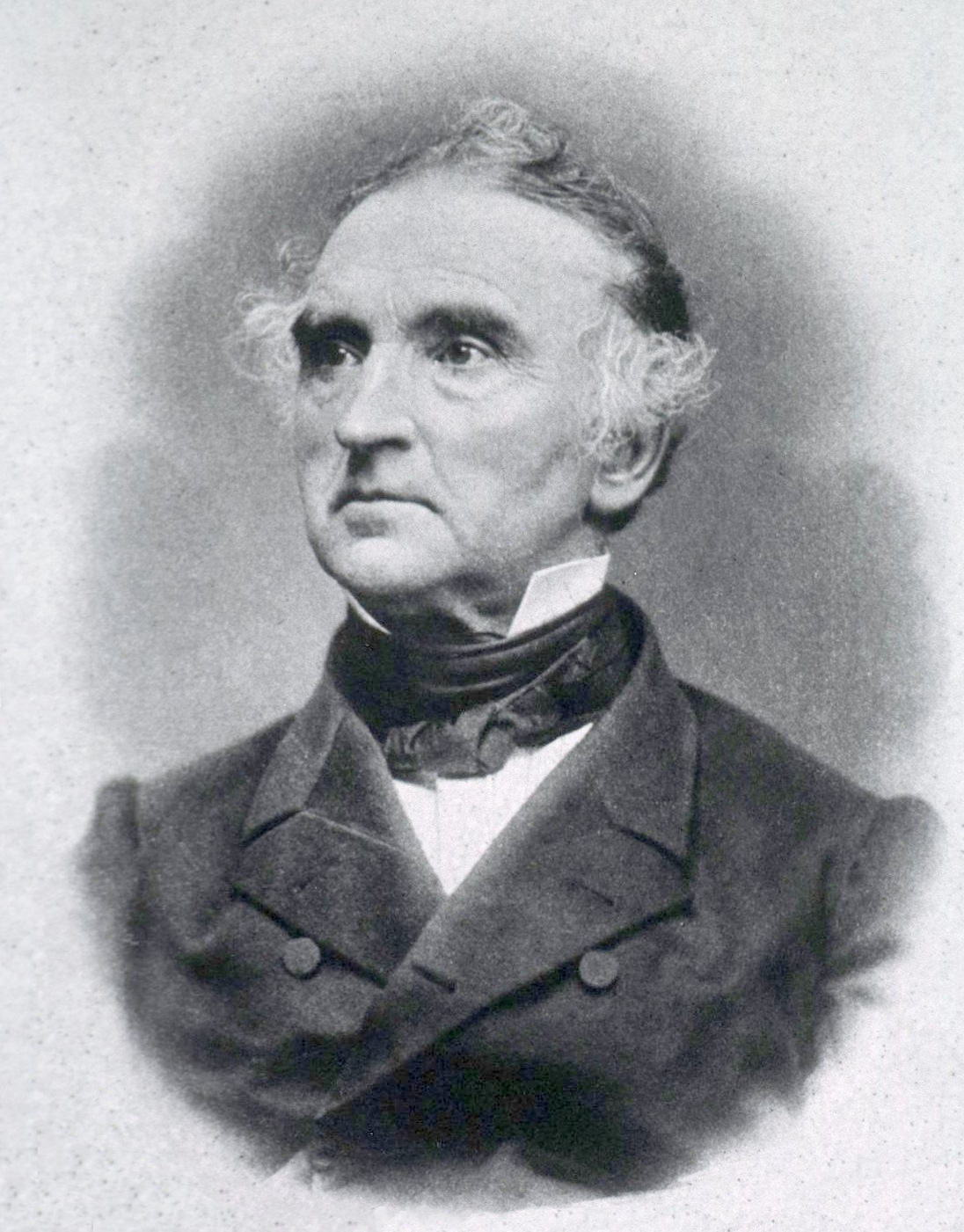
Justus von Liebig

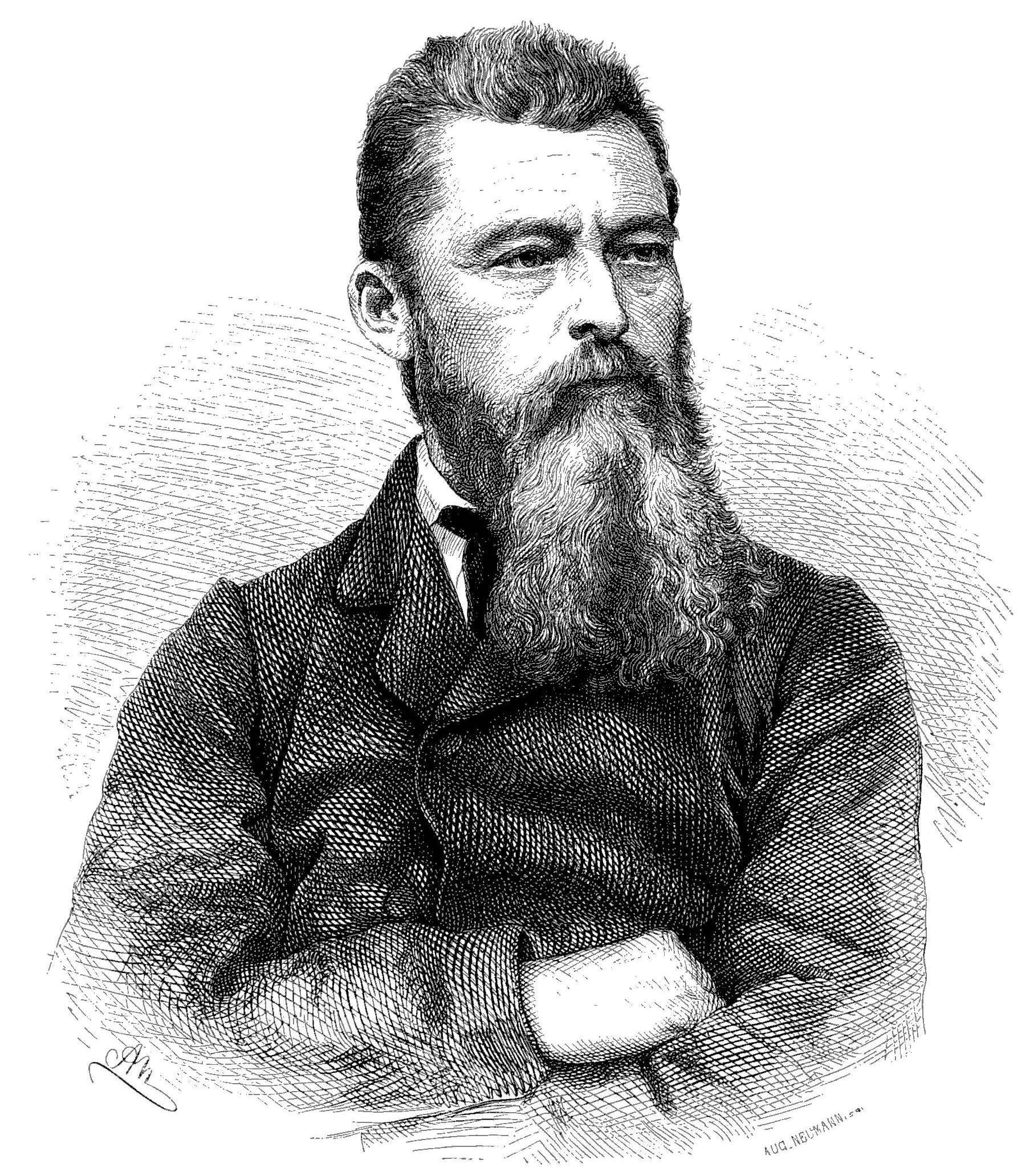
Ludwig Andreas Feuerbach

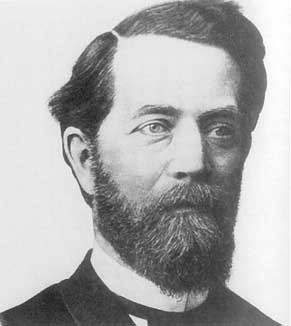
Felix Klein

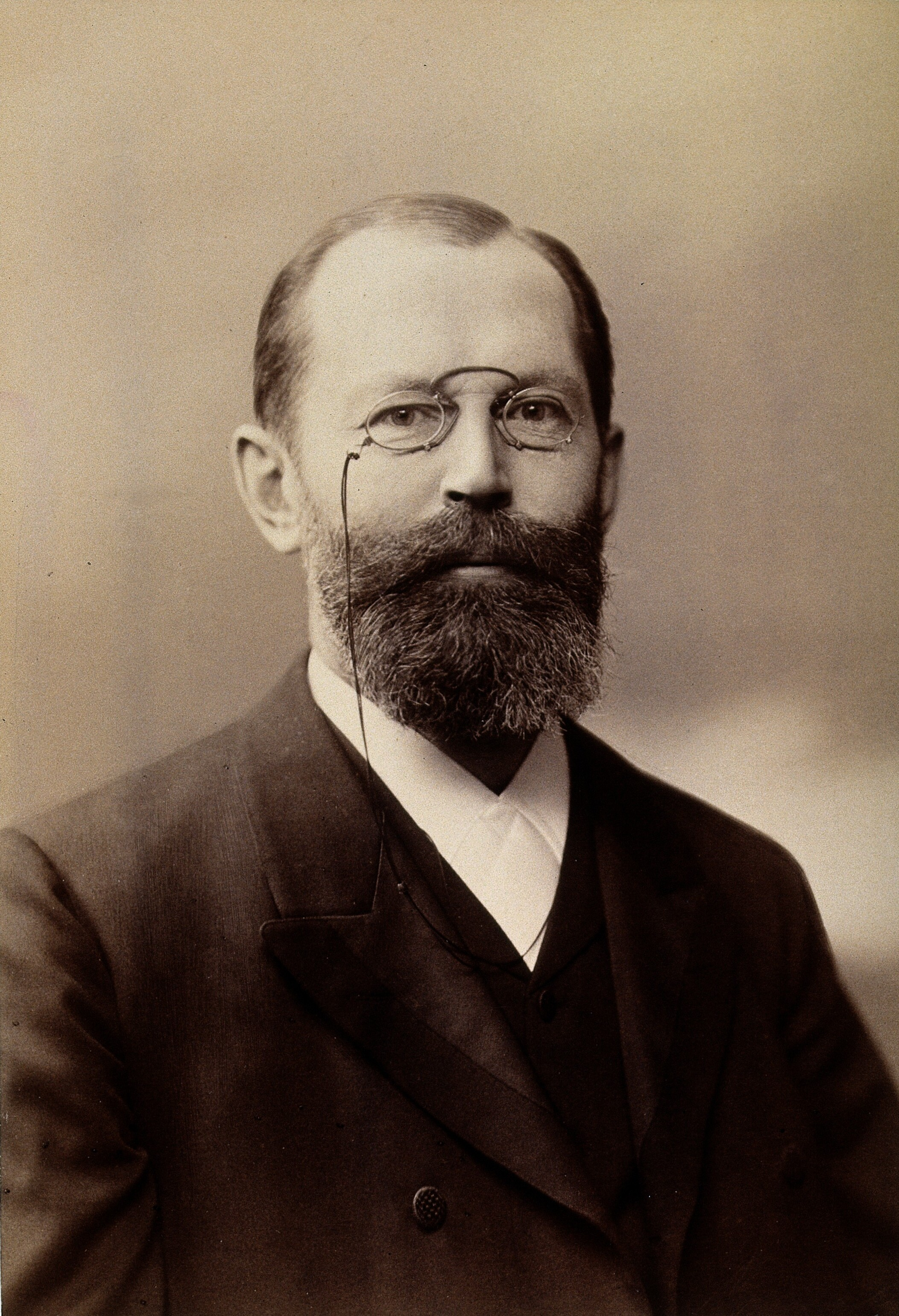
Hermann Emil Fischer

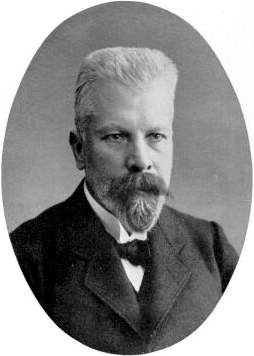
Eduard Buchner

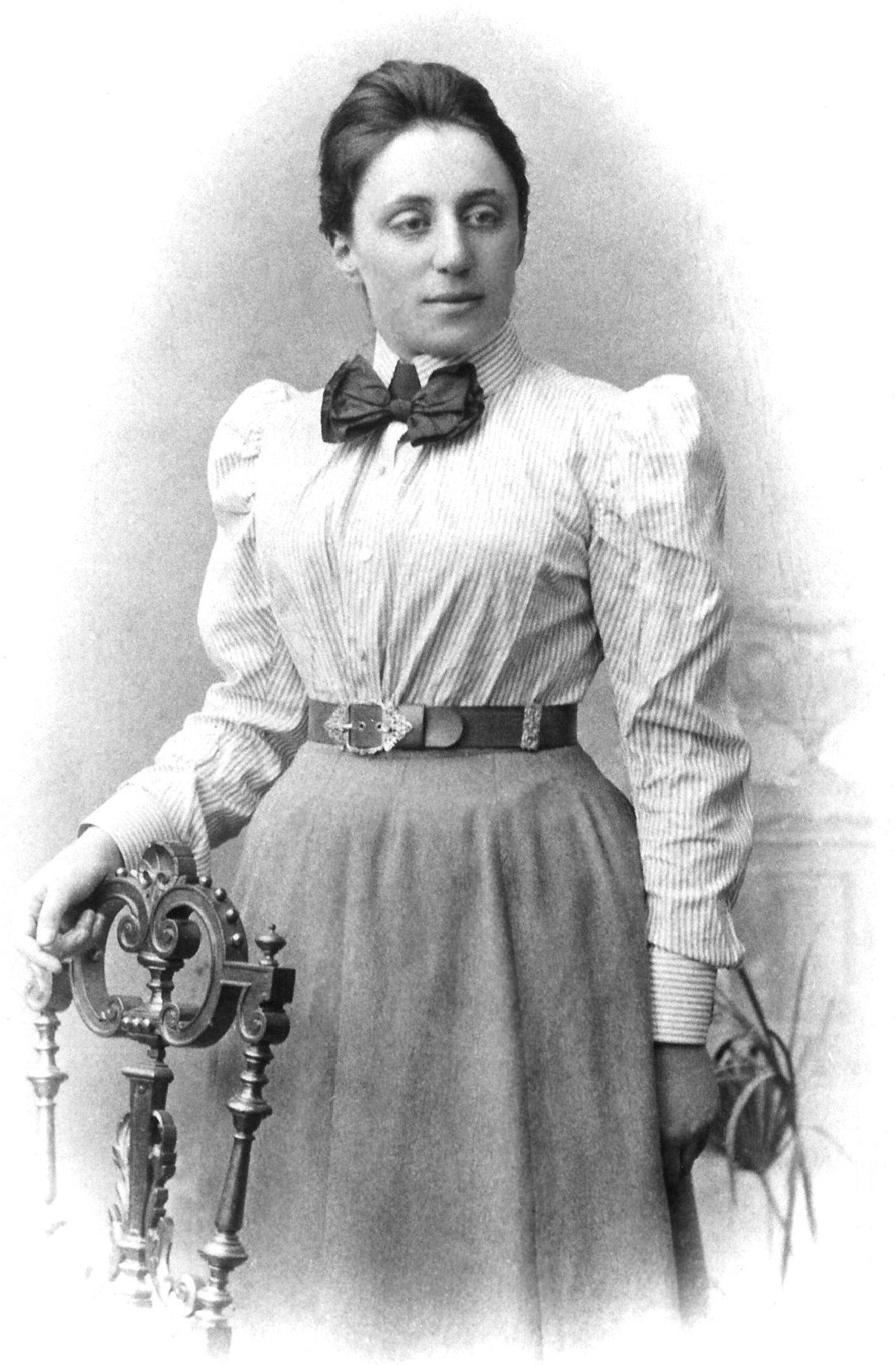
Emmy Noether

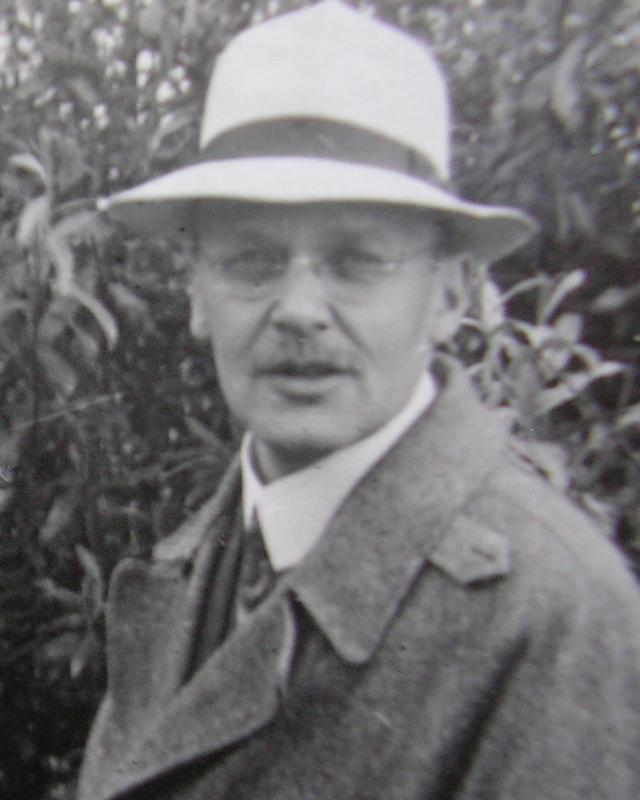
Hans Geiger

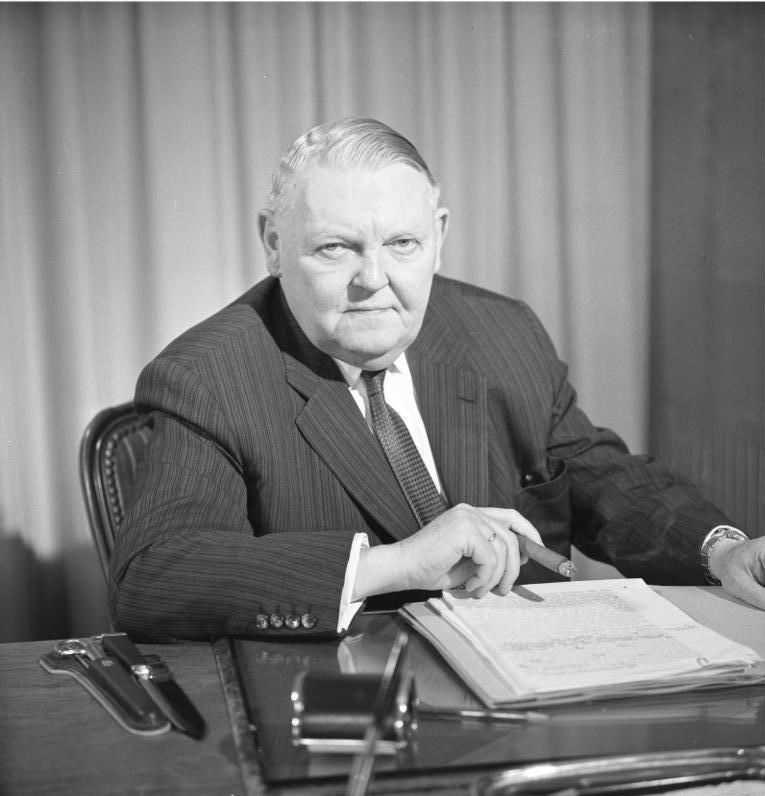
Ludwig Erhard

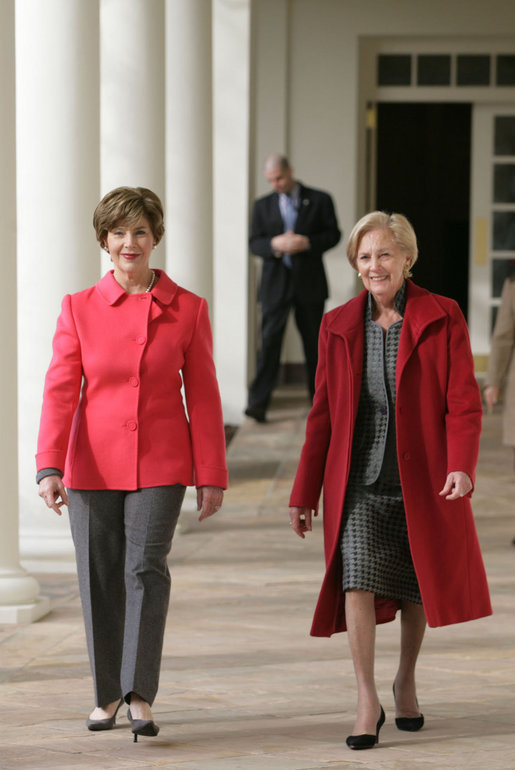
Alma Adamkienė

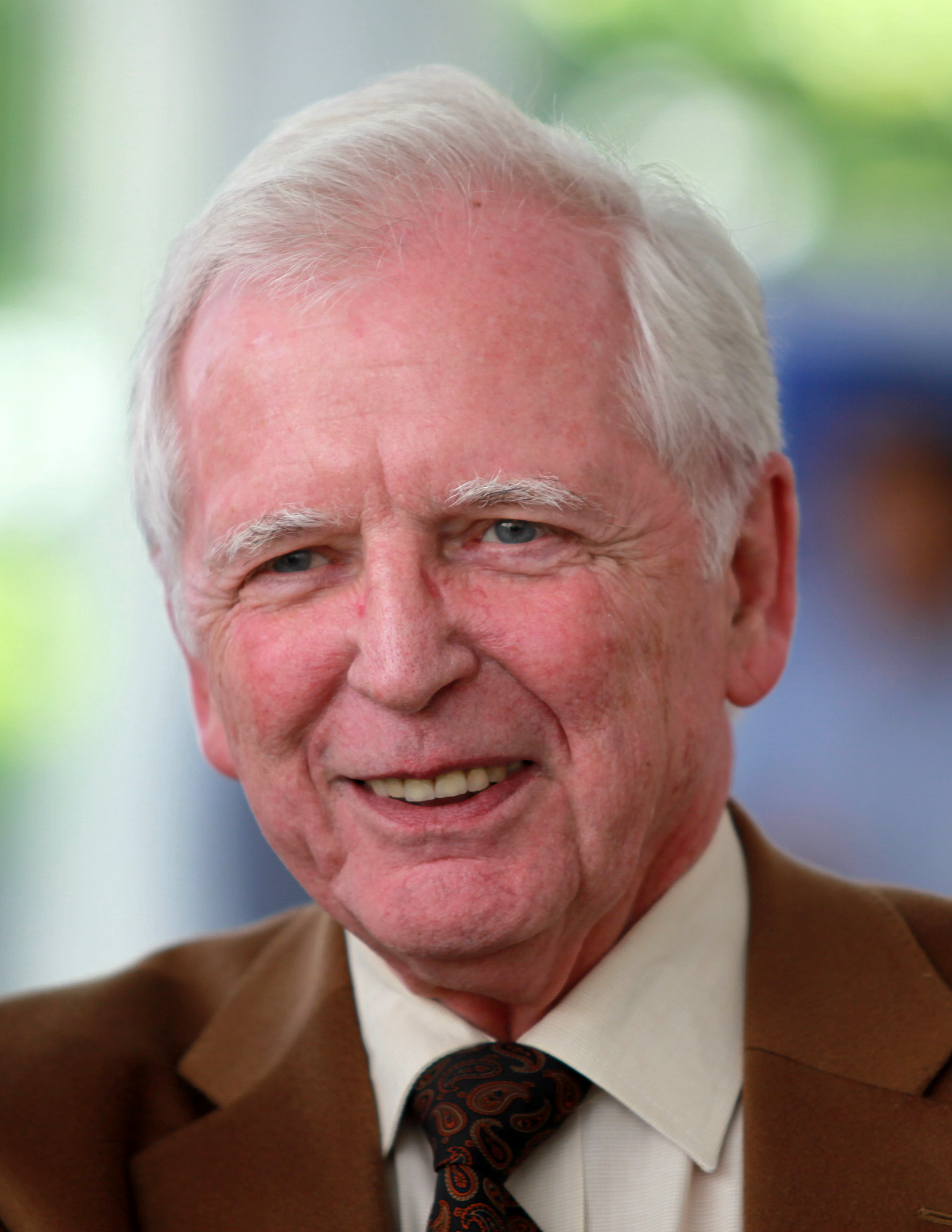
Harald zur Hausen

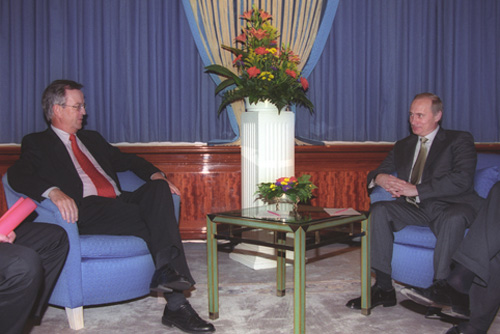
Heinrich von Pierer

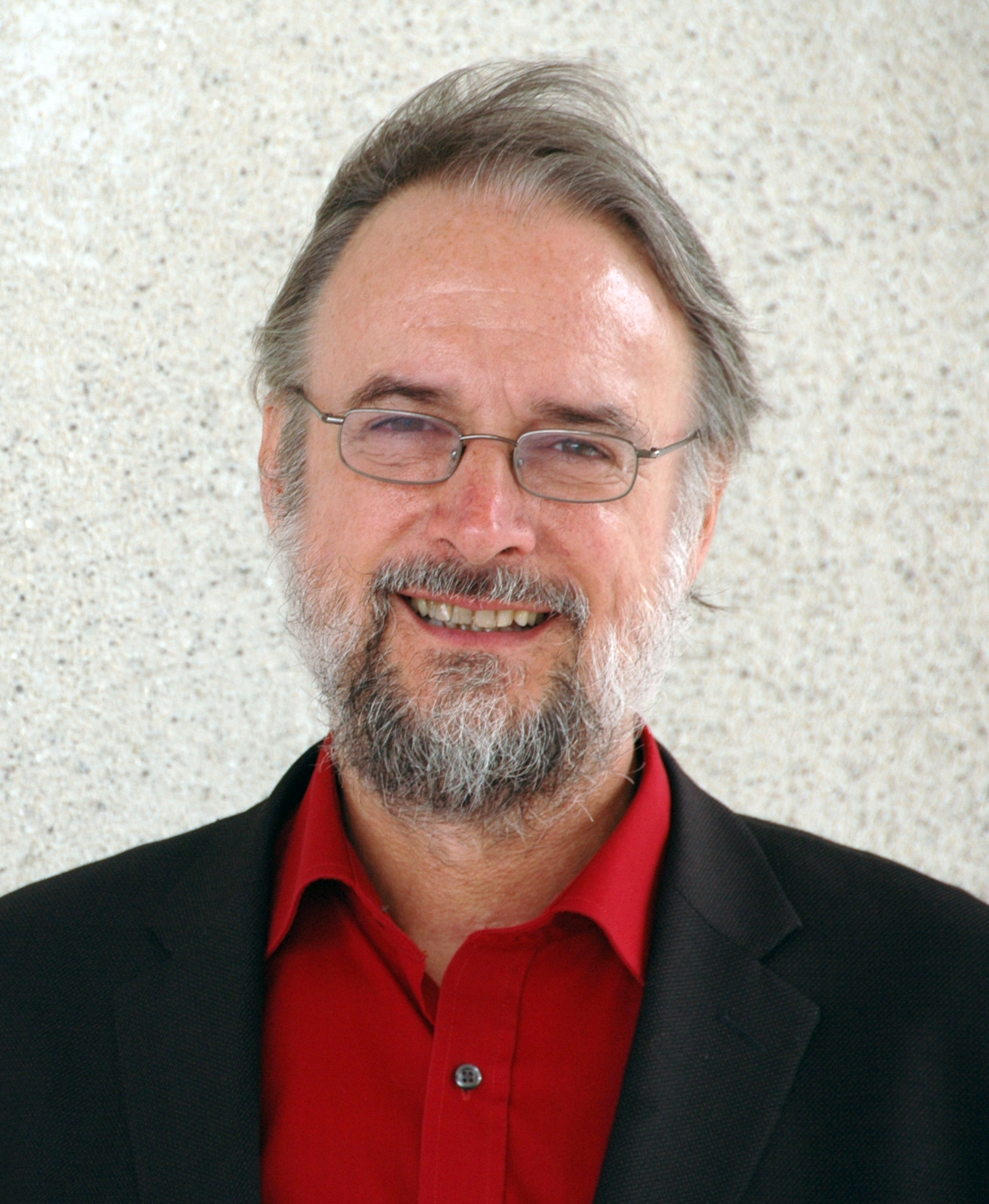
Karlheinz Brandenburg

== Gallery ==
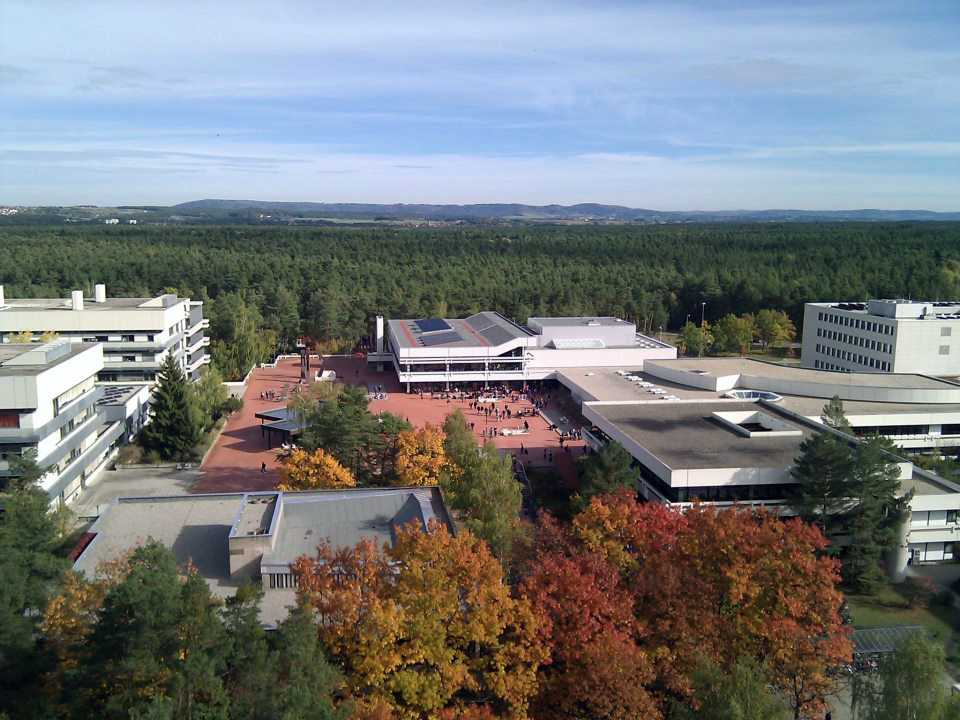
FAU Faculty of Engineering campus

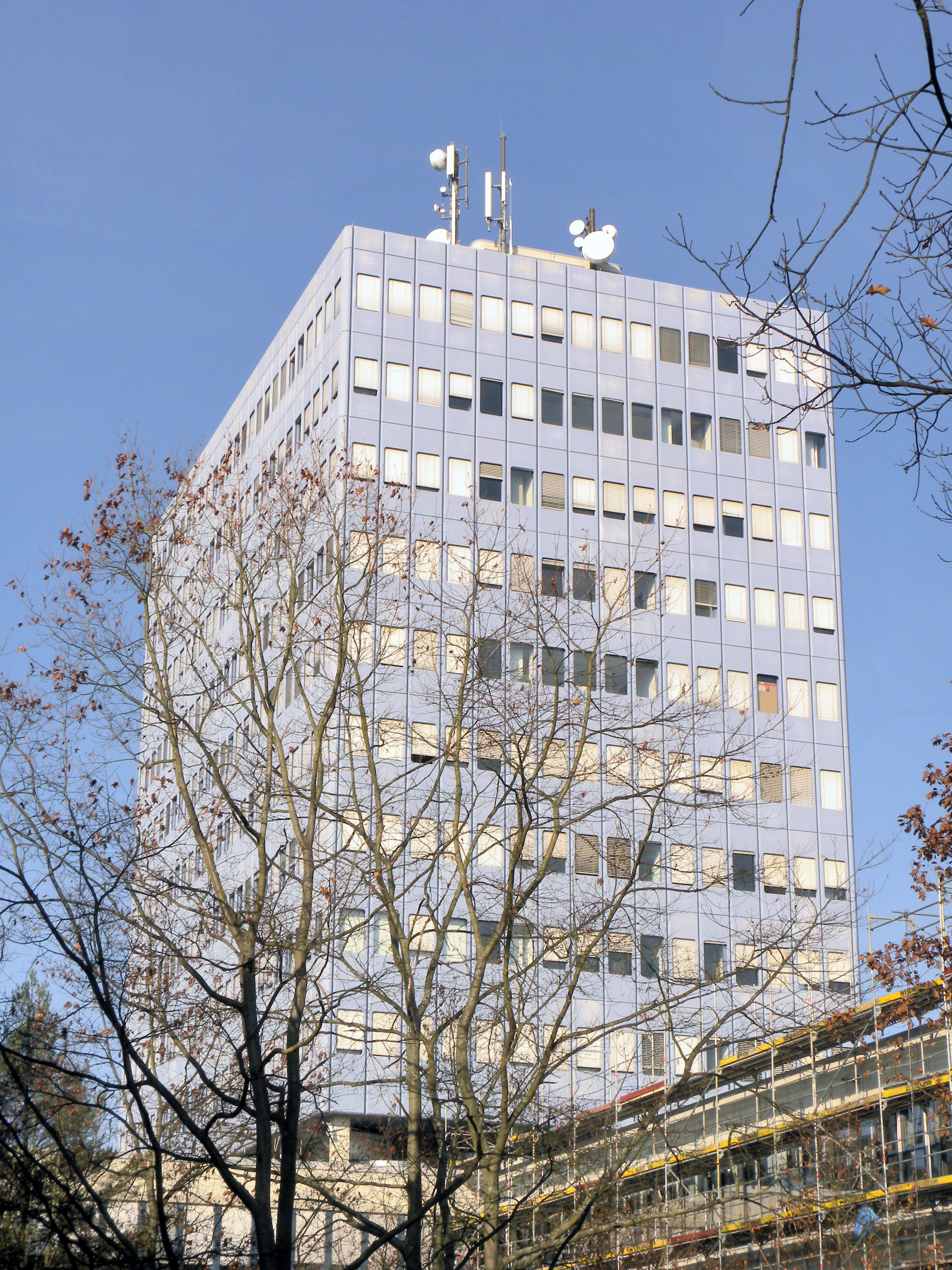
Department of Computer Science

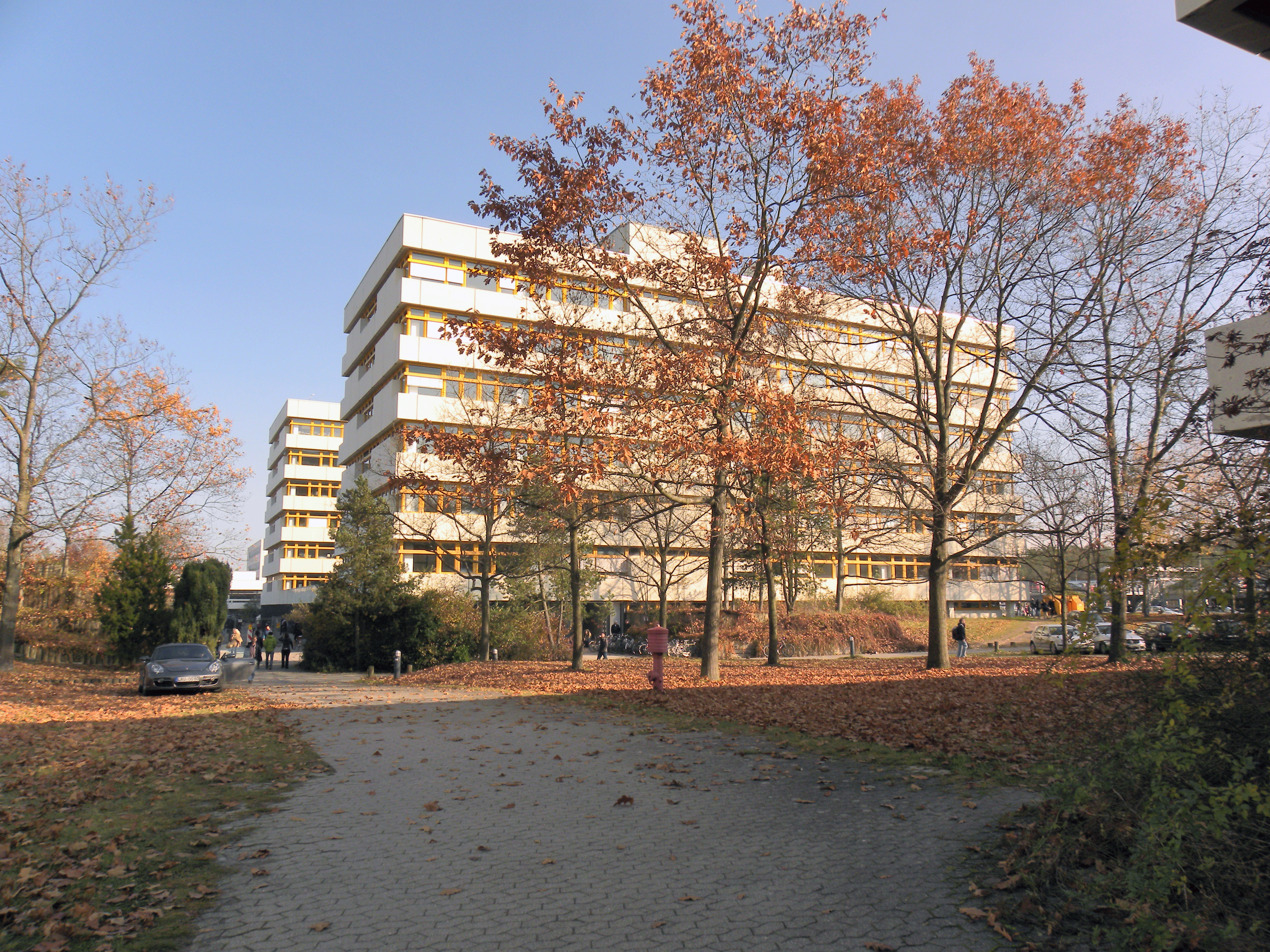
Department of Electrical, Electronic and Communication Engineering

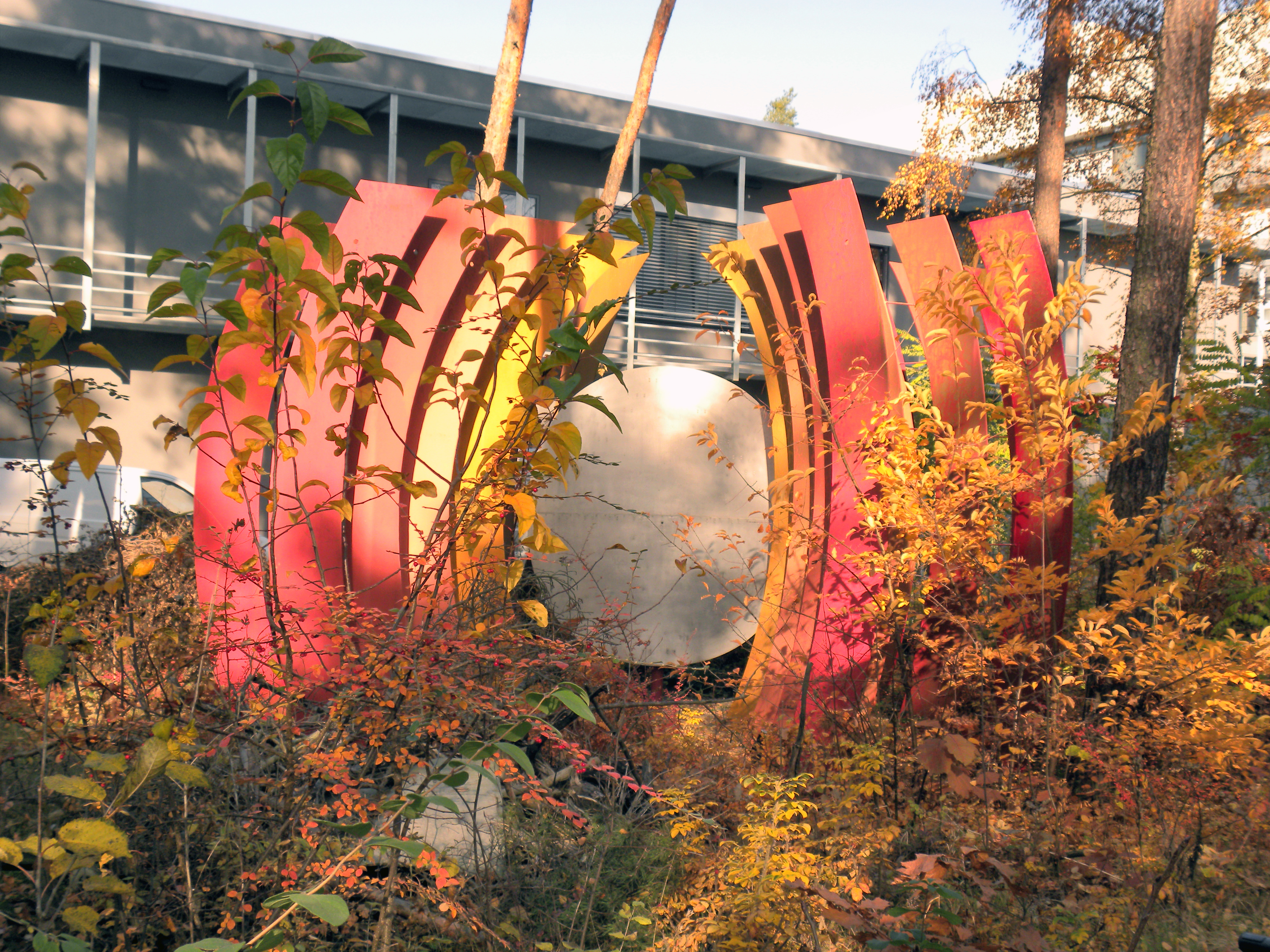
Property for good thoughts designed by Marian Bogusz, on the Faculty of Engineering campus

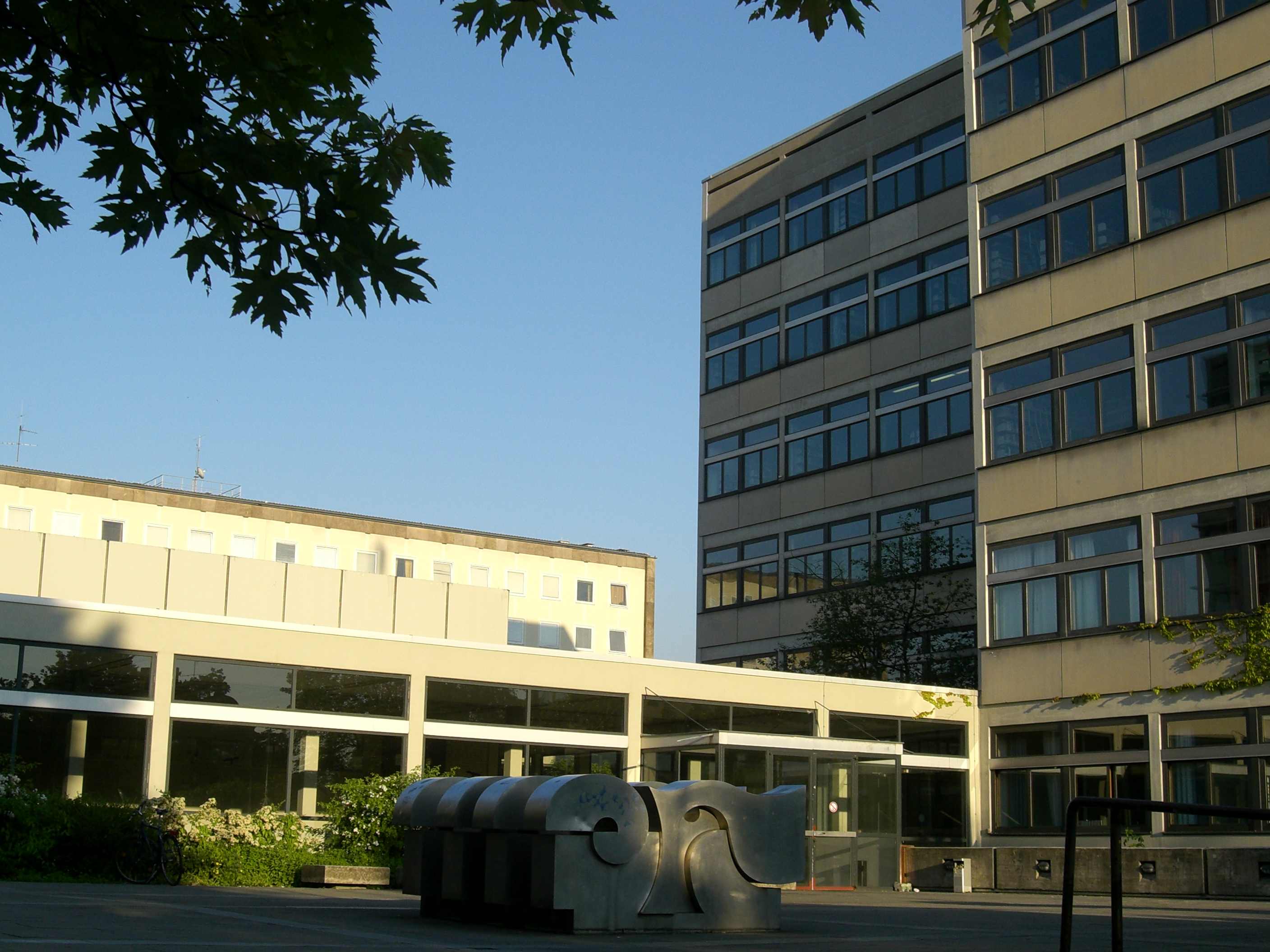
Faculty of Humanities, Social Sciences, and Theology and central lecture hall

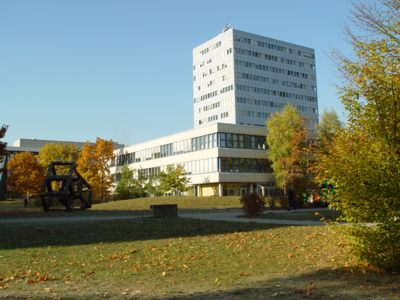
Regional Computing Centre

== See also ==
- List of early modern universities in Europe
- Recktenwald Prize
- Top Industrial Managers for Europe
- Fraunhofer Society
