= James A.F. Stoner =

James A.F. Stoner (born 1935) is an emeritus professor of Management Systems at the Gabelli School of Business Administration of Fordham University, and has been the holder of Fordham's James A.F. Stoner Chair in Global Quality Leadership.

== Education ==
Stoner earned his undergraduate BS degree in Engineering Science from Antioch College in 1959. Subsequently, he attended the Massachusetts Institute of Technology, where he received his master's degree in 1961 and his doctoral degree at the MIT School of Industrial (now the MIT Sloan School of Management) in 1967. Before beginning his academic career, Professor Stoner was a project-development officer for the Ministry of Commerce and Industry in the government of Tanganyika, which is today the nation of Tanzania.

== Career ==
Stoner has been a professor at Fordham University. Stoner is an author and co-author of a number of books and journal articles, including; Management, six editions, Prentice Hall; and Introduction to Business, Scott Foresman; and World-class Managing-Two Pages at a Time (co-author Freeload Press 2010). He is a member of the Academy of Management and past chair of the Management Education and Devilment Division, the American Society for Quality; the Academy of Business Education and the Organizational Behavior Teaching Society, the last of which he is a former board member of.

In addition to his responsibilities at Fordham, Stoner advised several major companies on the movement toward quality management and teaches in executive seminars on quality and management. He has taught in executive programs in North and South America, Europe, Africa, and Asia. In 1992, Fordham University established the James A.F. Stoner Chair in Quality Leadership

Stoner has accumulated many academic laurels. He was named a “profesor honorario" by the Universidad Catolica Santo Domingo, a “distinque profesor" by the Asosiación Dominica de Profesionales en Administración, and an honorific visiting professor at the Universidad de Ricardo Palma in Lima, Peru. At Fordham, he is a past recipient of the Gladys and Henry Crown Award for Faculty Excellence at the graduate level. He also earned a citation from the Academy of Management for best paper in management education. He also was Leading and Managing for Global Sustainability Designing and Creating For-Profit Enterprises that Contribute to Global Sustainability Management, Spirituality, and Organizational Excellence Creating Excellent Teams Ontological Inquiry, Excellence, and Personal and Organizational Transformation.
