= Alexander von Humboldt Professorship =

Academic research prize

The Alexander von Humboldt Professorship is an academic prize named after Alexander von Humboldt and awarded by the Alexander von Humboldt Foundation since 2008. The prize is intended to attract internationally leading scientists from abroad to Germany so that they can carry out top-level research there and strengthen Germany as a research location. The prize includes a permanent full professorship at the hosting university, plus 5 million euros for experimentally working scientists or 3.5 million euros for theoretically working scientists (in addition, the university is expected to provide matching funds). This makes it the most highly endowed research prize in Germany, and possibly world-wide. A maximum of ten Alexander von Humboldt Professorships can be awarded every year to researchers of all disciplines. From 2020 to 2024, an additional six Humboldt Professorships in the field of artificial intelligence can be awarded each year.

Nominations are made by German universities, possibly in cooperation with research institutions. The award is financed by the Federal Ministry of Education and Research within the framework of the International Research Fund for Germany.

== List of Alexander von Humboldt Professorships ==
The laureates are:

2009:

- Oliver Brock (born 1969), German computer scientist
- Piet Brouwer (born 1971), Dutch theoretical solid state physicist
- Giorgi Dvali (born 1964), Georgian particle physicist and cosmologist
- Ulrike Gaul (born 1960), German developmental biologist
- Norbert Langer (born 1958), German astrophysicist
- Martin Bodo Plenio (born 1968), German quantum optician
- Burkhard Rost (born 1961), German bioinformatician

2010:

- Marc Levine (born 1952), US-American mathematician
- Jürgen Margraf (born 1956), German psychologist
- Gerard J. van den Berg (born 1962), Dutch economist
- Philip van der Eijk (born 1962), Dutch classical philologist
- Matthias Wessling (born 1963), German process engineer

2011:

- Harald Clahsen (born 1955), German psycholinguist
- David DiVincenzo (born 1959), American physicist
- Brian Foster (born 1954), British elementary particle physicist
- Gerhard Kramer (born 1970), Canadian-German communications engineer
- Dirk Kreimer (born 1960), German theoretical physicist
- Hannes Leitgeb (born 1972), Austrian philosopher and mathematician
- Vahid Sandoghdar (born 1966), Iranian-American physicist
- Alec Wodtke (born 1959), American chemist

2012:

- Rolf Harald Baayen (born 1958), Dutch linguist
- Friedrich Eisenbrand (born 1971), German mathematician (funding ended prematurely)
- Jochen Guck (born 1973), German biophysicist
- Hans-Arno Jacobsen (born 1969), German computer scientist
- Robert Schober (born 1971), German engineer
- Matthias Tschöp (born 1967), German physician
- Michael Weiss (born 1955), German mathematician

2013:

- Gregory Crane (born 1957), US-American classical philologist
- Frank Fehrenbach (born 1963), German art historian
- Michael Neil Forster (born 1957), US-American philosopher
- Stephan Hartmann (born 1968), German philosopher of science
- Michael Köhl (born 1975), German physicist
- Oskar Painter (born 1972), Canadian physicist (funding ended prematurely)
- Wolfram Ruf (born 1958), German medical doctor

2014:

- Giuseppe Caire (born 1965), Italian information theorist
- Emmanuelle Charpentier (born 1968), French immunobiologist
- Stefanie Engel (born 1968), German environmental economist
- Stuart Parkin (born 1955), British physicist
- Andreas S. Schulz (born 1969), German mathematician
- Jairo Sinova (born 1972), Spanish-US-American physicist
- Hidenori Takagi (born 1961), Japanese physicist

2015:

- Élisabeth Décultot (born 1968), French literary scholar
- Harald Helfgott (born 1977), Peruvian mathematician
- Sharon Macdonald (born 1961), British ethnologist
- Karen Radner (born 1971), Austrian Orientalist
- Marja Timmermans (born 1964), plant geneticist

2016:

- Till Winfried Bärnighausen (born 1969), German epidemiologist
- Sven Bernecker (born 1967), German philosopher
- William Crawley-Boevey (born 1960), British mathematician
- Heinrich Jasper (born 1974), German molecular biologist
- Tiffany Knight (born 1975), US ecologist and environmental researcher
- Katrin Kogman-Appel (born 1958), Austrian Judaist
- Judith Pfeiffer (born 1964), German Islamic scholar
- Wolfgang Wernsdorfer (born 1966), German solid-state physicist

2017:

- Largus T. Angenent (born 1969), Dutch environmental microbiologist
- Peter Baumann (born 1969), German cell biologist
- Jijie Chai (born 1966), Chinese structural biologist
- James F. Conant (born 1958), US-American philosopher
- Wolf-Bernd Frommer (born 1958), German plant molecular biologist
- Ran Hirschl (born 1963), Israeli constitutional lawyer

2018:

- Anne van Aaken (born 1969), German jurist and economist
- Wil van der Aalst (born 1966), Dutch computer scientist
- B. Andrei Bernevig (born 1978), Romanian physicist
- Marco Caccamo (born 1971), Italian computer scientist
- Margaret C. Crofoot (born 1980), US biologist
- Ewa Dąbrowska (born 1963), Polish linguist
- Raul Fidel Tempone (born 1969), Italian-Uruguayan mathematician
- Arno Rauschenbeutel (born 1971), German quantum optician and nuclear physicist
- Guus F. Rimmelzwaan (born 1959), Dutch virologist and immunobiologist
- Michael Sieweke (born 1963), German cell biologist

2019:

- Malte Gather, German physicist
- Anke Hoeffler, German economist and political scientist
- Jens Meiler, German structural biologist
- Alexandre Obertelli (born 1978), French nuclear physicist
- Stefanie Petermichl (born 1971), German mathematician
- Dietmar Schmucker, German neuroscientist
- Henning Walczak (born 1966), German immunologist
- Enrique Zuazua (born 1961), Spanish mathematician

2020:

- Peter Dayan (born 1965), Theoretical Neuroscience
- Kristian Franze, Physical Biology
- Francisco Jesus Moreno-Fernández, Linguistics
- Daniel Rückert, Computer Science

2021:

- Andrea Bréard, History of Science & Sinology
- Christian Frezza, Metabolic Physiology
- Oskar Hallatschek, Biophysics
- Ive Hermans, Chemiker
- Stefan G. Hofmann, Translational Clinical Psychology
- Gustav Holzegel, Mathematics
- Jan Huisken, Medical Engineering
- Kou Murayama, Psychology
- Angela Schoellig, Robotics and Artificial Intelligence
- Bart Thomma, Microbiology
- Thorsten Wagener, Hydrology
- Aimee van Wynsberghe, AI and Robot Ethics

2022:

- Catherina G. Becker, German neurobiologist
- Matthias Doepke, economic theorist
- Bas E. Dutilh, bioinformatics scientist
- Holger Hoos, computer scientist
- Stefanie Jegelka, computer scientist
- Yaochu Jin, Chinese computer scientist
- Jan Karlseder, molecular biologist
- Markus Klute, German physicist
- Sven Koenig, computer scientist
- Sayan Mukherjee, Indian mathematician
- Vincent C. Müller, philosopher
- Kate Rigby, environmental humanities scholar
- Joacim Rocklöv, Swedish epidemiologist
- Suvrit Sra, mathematician
- Radu Timofte, Romanian computer scientist
- Angela Yu, neuroscientist

2023:

- Samarjit Chakraborty, computer scientist
- Dirk Englung, physicist
- Hanna Kokko, theoretical ecologist
- Tina Malti, clinical-developmental psychologist
- Edvardas Narevicius, chemist
- Thomas C. Südhof, neuroscientist
- Heike Vallery, mechanical engineer
- André Platzer, computer scientist
- Thomas Strohmer, mathematician
- Ingmar Weber, computer scientist
- Miki Ebisuya, developmental biologist
- Daniel Jobst Müller, cell biologist
- Robert Raußendorf, quantum information scientist
- Dieter Schmalstieg, computer scientist
- Hector Geffner, computer scientist
- Marcus Rohrbach, computer scientist

2024:

- Fatih Ömer İlday, (born in 1976), Turkish physicist
- Juan Daniel Prades Garcia, physicist
- Ariel Dora Stern, economist
- Arnim Wiek, sustainability scientist
- Peter N. Robinson, computational biologist

2025:

- Christopher Barner-Kowollik, Chemistry
- Dana Branzei, Molecular biology
- Sebastian Deindl, Structural biology
- Daniel Kráľ, Mathematics
- Ingrid Piller, Sociolinguistics
- Sandra Wachter, AI
- Andreas Winter, Quantum communication

2026:

- Simon Elsässer, Cell biology
- Sahika Inal, Bioengineering
- Reinhard Maurer, Theoretical chemistry
- Michael Moehler, Philosophy, Politics, and Economics
- Jan Rehwinkel, Immunology
- Michael Weber, Economic sciences

2027:

- Yong P. Chen, Quantum physics
- Daniel Jütte, Urban Humanities
- Jonathan Kimmelman, Bioethics
- Mathias Lichterfeld, Immunology
- Shahar Mendelson, Mathematics
- Michał Pilipczuk, Mathematics
- Nicholas Taylor, Structural biology
