= Ewa Dąbrowska =

Polish linguist

Ewa Dąbrowska (born in 1963 in Gdańsk, Poland) is a Polish linguist in the field of cognitive linguistics. She is a member of the Academia Europaea and is president of the UK Cognitive Linguistics Association. Between 2006 - 2013, Dąbrowska was the editor-in-chief of Cognitive Linguistics, a Q1-ranked international journal in Linguistics. She is a professor of English Language and Applied Linguistics at the University of Birmingham, UK.

== Education and career ==
Dąbrowska completed her PhD with distinction in Linguistics at the University of Gdańsk in 1995, and then worked as a lecturer there at the Institute of English & Department of Speech Science. She then worked at the University of Glasgow, the University of Sussex, the University of Sheffield and Northumbria University, before becoming a professor at the University of Birmingham in 2017.That year, she was awarded an Alexander von Humboldt Professorship, nominated by the University of Erlangen–Nuremberg, where she became the Chair of Language and Cognition (Humboldt Professor) in 2018. She continues to work for the University of Birmingham but since 2018 has done so part-time.

Dąbrowska has written several books, including Language, Mind and Brain: Some Psychological and Neurological Constraints on Theories of Grammar, and co-authored a series about cognitive linguistics with fellow University of Birmingham professor Dagmar Divjak.

In 2008, Dąbrowska was given Honorary Membership of the Polish Cognitive Linguistics Association. She became president of the UK Cognitive Linguistics Association in 2014, and was elected as a member of the Academia Europaea in 2024. She has been the editor-in-chief for the major international journal Cognitive Linguistics. As of 6th March 2025, her work has been cited 6137 times, according to Google Scholar.

== Research ==
Dąbrowska has a five-year project, funded by the Alexander von Humboldt Foundation, which studies individual differences in attainment and acquisition between speakers of the same first or second languages. She is an opponent of the theory of Universal Grammar, usually credited to Noam Chomsky, which holds that there are innate biological constraints on grammar in human languages. Her work challenges the generativist theory that children develop language in a uniform or universal way.

For example, she has done a series of studies looking at how lexically specific units (such as collocations and fixed phrases) help children and adult learners generalise linguistic patterns, replacing the need for innate syntactic mechanisms.

== Selected bibliography ==
=== Books written solely by Dąbrowska ===
- Dąbrowska, E. (2017). Ten Lectures on Grammar in the Mind. Brill (Distinguished Lectures in Cognitive Linguistics), Leiden (New edition, originally published in 2013). ISBN 978 90 04 33682 7
- Dąbrowska, E. (2004). Language, Mind and Brain: Some Psychological and Neurological Constraints on Theories of Grammar. Edinburgh University Press / Georgetown University Press. ISBN 978 1 4744 6601 1 (review)
- Dąbrowska, E. (1997). Cognitive Semantics and the Polish Dative. Mouton de Gruyter. ISBN 978 3 11 015218 0

=== Books co-written by Dąbrowska ===
- Dąbrowska, E. & Divjak, D. (2019) Cognitive Linguistics – Foundations of Language. De Gruyter Mouton. ISBN 978 3 11 062297 3 (review)
- Dąbrowska, E. & Divjak, D. (2019) Cognitive Linguistics – Key Topics. De Gruyter Mouton. ISBN 978 3 11 062299 7
- Dąbrowska, E. & Divjak, D. (2019) Cognitive Linguistics – A Survey of Linguistic Subfields. De Gruyter Mouton. ISBN 978 3 11 062298 0
- Dąbrowska, E. & Divjak, D. (2015). Handbook of Cognitive Linguistics. De Gruyter Mouton. ISBN 978 3 11 029184 1 (review)
- Dąbrowska, E. & Wojciech, K. (2003) Akwizycja języka w świetle językoznawstwa kognitywnego [Language acquisition from a cognitive perspective] Universitas. ISBN 978 83 242 0346 8

=== Articles ===
- Dąbrowska, E. (2019) Experience, Aptitude, and Individual Differences in Linguistic Attainment: A Comparison of Native and Nonnative Speakers. Language Learning (69), 72-100.
- Andringa, S. & Dąbrowska, E. (2019) Individual differences in first and second language ultimate attainment and their causes. Language Learning (69), 5-12.
- Dąbrowska, E. (2015) What exactly is Universal Grammar, and has anyone seen it? Frontiers in Psychology (6), 852.
- Dąbrowska, E. (2008) Questions with long-distance dependencies: A usage-based perspective. Cognitive Linguistics (19:3), 391-425.
- Dąbrowska, E. (2008) The later development of an early-emerging system: The curious case of the Polish genitive. Linguistics (46:3), 629–650.
- Dąbrowska, E. (2005) Productivity and beyond: mastering the Polish genitive inflection. Journal of Child Language (32), 191-205.
- Dabrowska, Ewa (2012) Different speakers, different grammars: Individual differences in native language attainment. Linguistic Approaches to Bilingualism, 2 (3). pp. 219-253.
- Dąbrowska, E. and Lieven, E. (2005) Towards a lexically specific grammar of children’s question constructions. Cognitive Linguistics, Vol. 16 (Issue 3), pp. 437-474.
