= Stefan Hofmann =

German-born clinical psychologist

Stefan Georg Hofmann
- Born: December 15, 1964 (age 61); Bietigheim-Bissingen, West Germany
- Citizenship: German
- Education: Philipps-Universität Marburg, Germany
- Known for: Process-based Therapy; Cognitive behavioral therapy Translational clinical psychology
- Awards: Alexander von Humboldt Professor (2021); Humboldt Research Award (2017); AAAS Fellow (2020); Fellow, ABCT (2015); Fellow, APA (2014); Fellow, APS (2011); ISI Highly Cited Researcher since 2016; ABCT Lifetime Achievement Award (2023); Aaron T. Beck Award (2015)
- Scientific career
- Fields: Clinical psychology Emotion; Anxiety disorders Neuroscience
- Workplaces: Philipps-Universität Marburg, Germany; Boston University, United States; Stanford University, United States
- Doctoral advisor: Anke Ehlers; Walton T. Roth
- Other academic advisors: David H. Barlow

Stefan G. Hofmann (born December 15, 1964) is a German-born clinical psychologist and researcher whose work focuses on emotion regulation, social and cultural influences on well-being, and the biopsychosocial processes of change in psychotherapy, including mindfulness-based interventions and cognitive behavioral therapy (CBT) for mood, stress, and anxiety disorders. He is the Alexander von Humboldt Professor of Translational Clinical Psychology at Philipps-Universität Marburg, and was previously a professor at Boston University.

Hofmann's research includes studies on the personalization of psychotherapy, pharmacological augmentation of exposure therapy, and the development of process-based therapy (PBT). His work on social anxiety has been discussed in outlets including The Atlantic and The New York Times. He has authored more than 500 peer-reviewed articles and over 20 books, including a college textbook on psychopathology, and has been named a Highly Cited Researcher by Web of Science/Clarivate Analytics every year since 2016. (Note: The claim of continuous Highly Cited Researcher status since 2016 is corroborated by institutional sources (Humboldt Foundation, Philipps-Universität Marburg, CMBB CV), though independent year-by-year verification from Clarivate's published lists is not publicly accessible.)

Hofmann was the editor-in-chief of the journal Cognitive Therapy and Research from 2012 to 2024. He is the incoming editor-in-chief of Psychological Bulletin, APA's flagship journal for research synthesis, beginning in 2026. He served as president of the Association for Behavioral and Cognitive Therapies (2012–2013), the International Association for Cognitive Psychotherapy (2014–2017), and the Academy of Cognitive Therapy (2022–2023).

== Education ==
Hofmann began studying psychology in 1985 at Philipps-Universität Marburg, Germany, where he earned his diploma in psychology (Dipl.-Psych.) in 1990 and his doctorate (Dr. rer. nat., magna cum laude) in 1993 under the supervision of Anke Ehlers and Walton T. Roth, who were based at Stanford University at the time. He subsequently completed postdoctoral work with David H. Barlow at the Center for Stress and Anxiety Disorders, University at Albany, SUNY, from 1994 to 1996 and clinical training in cognitive therapy with Aaron T. Beck in 2003.

== Career ==
Hofmann began his career as a research scientist at Stanford University supported by a dissertation fellowship from the DAAD (German Academic Exchange Service) and later post-doctoral work at SUNY Albany. He continued at Boston University as a research assistant professor in the Department of Psychology in 1996. He accepted a position as a tenure-track assistant professor in 1999, received tenure and was promoted to associate professor in 2003, and in 2008 to full professor in the Department of Psychological and Brain Sciences at Boston University, where he directed the Psychotherapy and Emotion Research Laboratory (PERL) until 2021.

In 2021, Hofmann received the Alexander von Humboldt Professor award and moved to Philipps-Universität Marburg in Germany, where he holds the LOEWE Spitzenprofessur for Translational Clinical Psychology and heads the division for translational clinical psychology. The move was supported by €5 million in funding from the Humboldt Foundation and an additional €2.52 million in LOEWE funding from the Hessian state government over a period of 5 years.

Prior to the Humboldt Professorship, Hofmann received the Humboldt Research Award in 2017, which facilitated a visiting research stay at the Universität Würzburg, Germany. He served as an advisor during the DSM-5 development process, as a member of the Anxiety Disorder Sub-Work Group and the Cross-Cutting Assessment Group, and was a member of the revision process for culture-related diagnostic issues of anxiety disorders of the DSM-5-TR.

He received the ABCT Lifetime Achievement Award for 2023, presented at the association's 2024 convention.

== Research ==
=== Clinical translational research ===
Hofmann's research focuses on translating discoveries from emotion research and neuroscience into clinical applications, particularly in the treatment of anxiety disorders. He has published numerous studies on the mechanisms of mindfulness-based interventions and cognitive behavioral therapy, including large-scale meta-analyses of CBT efficacy across psychological disorders.

=== Pharmacological augmentation of psychotherapy ===
Exposure therapy for anxiety disorders operates partly through extinction learning. Hofmann has studied the use of d-cycloserine, a partial agonist of the glutamate receptor, as an adjunct to exposure therapy. Initial studies suggested that d-cycloserine could enhance extinction learning, but subsequent research and meta-analyses have produced mixed results. Evidence suggests that d-cycloserine may improve outcomes when exposure sessions are well conducted but can worsen outcomes when exposure is poorly administered, though subsequent meta-analyses have produced mixed results: a Cochrane review found no evidence of benefit over placebo, a large individual participant data meta-analysis reported only a small augmentation effect, and later meta-analyses have questioned the usefulness of d-cycloserine augmentation altogether. The clinical significance of these effects remains debated. Hofmann has drawn an analogy to Schrödinger's cat, noting that d-cycloserine augmentation is "both dead and alive"—its effect uncertain until the quality of the exposure session determines whether it helps or harms.

=== Social anxiety disorder ===
A substantial portion of Hofmann's research has addressed social anxiety disorder, including its maintaining mechanisms and treatment. In a 2007 theoretical paper, he proposed a comprehensive cognitive model of social anxiety identifying self-focused attention, post-event rumination, and perceived social cost as key maintenance factors, and outlined treatment implications of this model. Drawing on this model, Hofmann has studied social mishap exposures (also termed social cost exposures), in which patients with social anxiety deliberately commit minor social violations during structured exposure exercises—for example, asking a stranger an overly personal question or intentionally making a minor mistake during a public task. The rationale, grounded in the cognitive model, is that such exercises directly test patients' beliefs about the catastrophic consequences of social errors; by observing that feared outcomes typically do not occur or are tolerable, patients may revise inflated estimates of social cost and reduce reliance on safety behavior. Hofmann has continued to investigate this approach, including a 2024 commentary on targeting perfectionism in social anxiety through social mishap exposures. His work on social anxiety has received media attention, including coverage in The Atlantic and The New York Times.

=== Emotion research ===
Hofmann has contributed to research on mindfulness-based interventions and the role of emotion in therapy. In collaboration with colleagues, he conducted a meta-analysis on the effects of mindfulness-based therapy on anxiety and depression. He has also proposed an interpersonal emotion regulation model of mood and anxiety disorders. Hofmann's work on interpersonal emotion regulation argues that emotions are often regulated through relationships, and understanding these social regulatory processes is essential for understanding psychopathology and therapeutic change. He has developed the Interpersonal Emotion Regulation Questionnaire (IERQ). Among his other contributions to emotion research, Hofmann has investigated the role of intranasal oxytocin in psychiatric symptoms; a 2015 meta-analysis on this topic was retracted and replaced in 2016 after coding errors were identified, and the corrected analysis found no evidence of efficacy over placebo.

=== Process-based therapy ===
In collaboration with Steven C. Hayes, Hofmann has been developing process-based therapy (PBT), an idiographic treatment approach based on cognitive behavioral therapy that integrates insights from evolution theory and complex network theory to target the processes underlying effective psychological treatments. Together with David Sloan Wilson, they have also argued that clinical psychology should be grounded in an evolutionary framework. PBT conceptualizes psychopathology as maladaptation to a given context, rather than as an expression of a latent disease entity. PBT views the person as a dynamic system of biopsychosocial processes that requires healthy flexibility to adapt to an ever-changing context. These processes interact to form a complex network. The structural and dynamic features of this network are the foundations for developing a personalized, process-focused approach to psychotherapy. Effective treatment targets the underlying core processes driving psychopathology rather than relying on diagnostic categories. Although PBT is rooted in CBT and other evidence-based treatments, it rejects the contemporary therapy protocol-for-syndrome approach and advocates for a functional-analytic and idiographic approach to therapy.

PBT has attracted some criticism. Paul M. G. Emmelkamp questioned whether a process-based approach is necessary, arguing that existing evidence-based treatments already incorporate process considerations and that the empirical support for PBT remains limited.

== Selected works ==
=== Books ===
- Hofmann, S. G. (2011). An introduction to modern CBT: Psychological solutions to mental health problems. Wiley-Blackwell. ISBN 978-0470971765.
- Hofmann, S. G. (2016). Emotion in therapy: From science to practice. Guilford Press. ISBN 978-1462524488.
- Barlow, D. H., Durand, V. M., & Hofmann, S. G. (2022). Psychopathology: An integrative approach to mental disorders (9th ed.). Cengage Learning. ISBN 978-0357657843.
- Hayes, S. C. & Hofmann, S. G. (Eds.) (2018). Process-based CBT: The science and core clinical competencies of cognitive behavioral therapy. New Harbinger. ISBN 978-1626255968.
- Hofmann, S. G. & Doan, S. N. (2018). The social foundations of emotion: Developmental, cultural, and clinical dimensions. American Psychological Association. ISBN 978-1433829277.
- Hayes, S. C. & Hofmann, S. G. (Eds.) (2020). Beyond the DSM: Toward a process-based alternative for diagnosis and mental health treatment. Context Press. ISBN 978-1684036615.
- Hofmann, S. G. (2020). The anxiety skills workbook: Simple CBT and mindfulness strategies for overcoming anxiety, fear, and worry. New Harbinger. ISBN 1684034523.
- Hofmann, S. G., Hayes, S. C., & Lorscheid, D. (2021). Learning process-based therapy: A skills training manual. New Harbinger. ISBN 1684037557.
- Hofmann, S. G. (2023). CBT for social anxiety. New Harbinger. ISBN 1648481205.

=== Selected articles ===
- Hofmann, S. G. (2007). Cognitive factors that maintain social anxiety disorder: A comprehensive model and its treatment implications. Cognitive Behaviour Therapy, 36, 195–209. doi:10.1080/16506070701421313
- Hofmann, S. G., Sawyer, A. T., Witt, A. A., & Oh, D. (2010). The effect of mindfulness-based therapy on anxiety and depression: A meta-analytic review. Journal of Consulting and Clinical Psychology, 78(2), 169–183. doi:10.1037/a0018555
- Hofmann, S. G., Asnaani, A., Vonk, I. J., Sawyer, A. T., & Fang, A. (2012). The efficacy of cognitive behavioral therapy: A review of meta-analyses. Cognitive Therapy and Research, 36(5), 427–440. doi:10.1007/s10608-012-9476-1
- Hofmann, S. G., Sawyer, A. T., Fang, A., & Asnaani, A. (2012). Emotion dysregulation model of mood and anxiety disorders. Depression and Anxiety, 29(5), 409–416. doi:10.1002/da.21888
- Hofmann, S. G. (2014). Interpersonal Emotion Regulation Model of Mood and Anxiety Disorders. Cognitive Therapy and Research, 38(5), 483–492. doi:10.1007/s10608-014-9620-1
- Whitfield-Gabrieli, S., Ghosh, S. S., Nieto-Castanon, A., Saygin, Z., Doehrmann, O., Chai, X. J., Reynold, G. O., Hofmann, S. G., Pollack, M. H., & Gabrieli, J. D. E. (2016). Brain connectomics predict response to treatment in social anxiety disorder. Molecular Psychiatry, 21(5), 680–685. doi:10.1038/mp.2015.109
- Hofmann, S. G. (2016). Schrödinger's cat and d-cycloserine to augment exposure therapy – both are dead and alive. JAMA Psychiatry, 73(8), 771–772. doi:10.1001/jamapsychiatry.2016.1132
- Hayes, S. C. & Hofmann, S. G. (2017). The third wave of CBT and the rise of process-based care. World Psychiatry, 16(2), 245–246. doi:10.1002/wps.20442
- Hofmann, S. G. & Hayes, S. C. (2019). The future of intervention science: Process-based therapy. Clinical Psychological Science, 7(1), 37–50. doi:10.1177/2167702618772296
- Phelps, E. A. & Hofmann, S. G. (2019). Memory editing from science fiction to clinical practice. Nature, 572, 43–50. doi:10.1038/s41586-019-1433-7
- Hofmann, S. G. (2020). The age of depression and its treatment. JAMA Psychiatry, 77(7), 667–668. doi:10.1001/jamapsychiatry.2020.0158
- Hayes, S. C. & Hofmann, S. G. (2021). "Third-wave" cognitive and behavioral therapies and the emergence of a process-based approach to intervention in psychiatry. World Psychiatry, 20(3), 363–375. doi:10.1002/wps.20884
- Hofmann, S. G. (2024). Targeting perfectionism in social anxiety with social mishap exposures. Clinical Psychology: Science and Practice, 31, 344–347. doi:10.1037/cps0000222

== Awards and recognition ==
- Aaron T. Beck Award for Significant and Enduring Contributions to Cognitive Therapy, Academy of Cognitive Therapy (2015)
- Humboldt Research Award (2017)
- APF Spielberger EMPathy Award, American Psychological Foundation (2017)
- Alexander von Humboldt Professor (2021)
- ISI Highly Cited Researcher, Clarivate Analytics (since 2016)
- ABCT Lifetime Achievement Award (2023)

=== Fellowships and academy memberships ===
- Fellow, Association for Psychological Science (2011)
- Fellow, American Psychological Association (2014)
- Member, Academia Europaea (2018)
- Fellow, American Association for the Advancement of Science (2020)
