= Humboldt Research Award =

German research award

The Humboldt Research Award (German: Humboldt-Forschungspreis), also known informally as the Humboldt Prize, is an award given by the Alexander von Humboldt Foundation of Germany to internationally renowned scientists and scholars who work outside of Germany in recognition of their lifetime's research achievements. Recipients are "academics whose fundamental discoveries, new theories or insights have had a significant impact on their own discipline and who are expected to continue producing cutting-edge academic achievements in the future". The prize is currently valued at €80,000 with the possibility of further support during the prize winner's life. Up to one hundred such awards are granted each year. Nominations must be submitted by established academics in Germany. As of 2023, over 2,000 awards have been granted.

The award is named after the Prussian naturalist and explorer Alexander von Humboldt. The Alexander von Humboldt Foundation also awards other prices and scholarships, notably the most valuable research prize in Germany, the Alexander von Humboldt Professorship.

== See also ==
- Alexander von Humboldt Foundation
- Humboldt Research Award recipients
- List of general science and technology awards
- List of physics awards
