= Andrea Bréard =

German historian of mathematics

Andrea Bréard (also published as Andrea Eberhard and Andrea Eberhard-Bréard) is a German historian of mathematics and sinologist specializing in Chinese mathematics. She is Alexander von Humboldt Professor of Sinology in the Department of Classical World and Asian Cultures at the University of Erlangen–Nuremberg.

== Education and career ==
Bréard earned a diploma in mathematics at the Technical University of Munich in 1991. After continuing study in China at Fudan University, she returned to Germany for a PhD at Technische Universität Berlin in 1997, supervised by Eberhard Knobloch. She earned a second doctorate in 1998 in France through Paris Diderot University, and completed a habilitation at Technische Universität Berlin in 2008.

She worked as a researcher at the Technical University of Munich from 1992 to 2004, under the direction of Konrad Königsberger. From 2005 to 2017 she was maître de conférences at the University of Lille in France, also holding various short-term positions in France, Germany, and the US. From 2017 to 2021 she held a professorship at Paris-Saclay University, and in 2021 she moved to the University of Erlangen–Nuremberg as Humboldt Professor.

== Recognition ==
Bréard was one of two 1998 recipients of the thesis prize of the Association française d'études chinoises. She was the 1999 recipient of the prize for young historians of the International Academy of the History of Science.

Bréard was elected as a corresponding member of the International Academy of the History of Science in 2015. She was elected to the German National Academy of Sciences Leopoldina in 2021.

== Books ==
Bréard's books include:

- Re-Kreation eines mathematischen Konzeptes im chinesischen Diskurs: "Reihen" vom 1. bis zum 19. Jahrhundert [Re-creation of a mathematical concept in Chinese discourse: "Series" from the first to the nineteenth century] (dissertation, TU Berlin, 1997; Boethius: Texte und Abhandlungen zur Geschichte der Mathematik und der Naturwissenschaften, vol. 42, Franz Steiner Verlag, 1999)
- Reform, Bureaucratic Expansion and Production of Numbers: Statistics in Early 20th Century China (Habilitationsschrift, TU Berlin, 2008)
- Nine Chapters on Mathematical Modernity: Essays on the Global Historical Entanglements of the Science of Numbers in China (Transcultural Research—Heidelberg Studies on Asia and Europe in a Global Context, Springer, 2019)
- Li Shanlan. Catégories analogues d'accumulations discrètes. [Analogical categories of discrete accumulations] (Bibliothèque chinoise, vol. 40, Les Belles Lettres, 2023)
