= Catherina Becker =

German researcher (born 1964)

Catherina Gwynne Becker
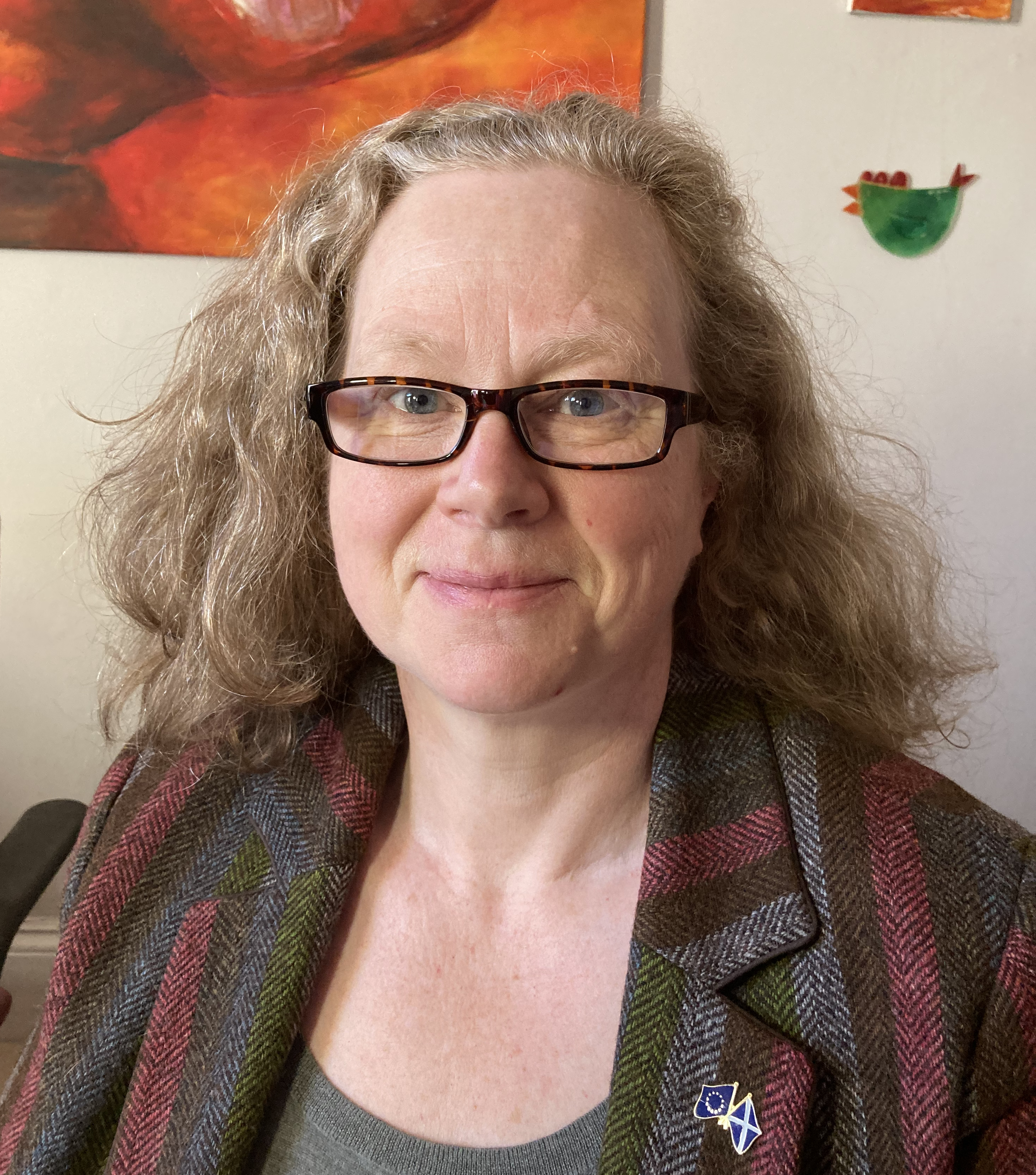
- Becker in 2021
- Born: 30 October 1964 (age 61); Marburg, West Germany (now Germany)
- Education: University of Bremen
- Scientific career
- Fields: Regenerative Neuroscience
- Workplaces: TU Dresden, University of Edinburgh

Catherina Gwynne Becker (née Krüger) (born 1964) is W3 professor for Neural Development and Regeneration Alexander von Humboldt Professor at TU Dresden, and was formerly Professor of Neural Development and Regeneration at the University of Edinburgh.

== Early life and education ==
Catherina Becker was born in Marburg, Germany in 1964. She was educated at the Kippenberg Gymnasium in Bremen, before going on to study at the University of Bremen where she obtained an MSci of Biology and her PhD (Dr. rer. nat.) in 1993, investigating visual system development and regeneration in frogs and salamanders under the supervision of Gerhard Roth. She then trained as post-doctoral fellow at the Swiss Federal Institute of Technology in Zürich, funded by an EMBO long-term fellowship, the Department of Dev Cell Biol at the University of California, Irvine in USA funded by the German Research Foundation (DFG), and the Centre for Molecular Neurobiology Hamburg (ZMNH), Germany where she took a position of group leader in 2000 and finished her ‚Habilitation' in Neurobiology in 2004 funded by a DFG Habilitation Fellowship.

== Career ==
Becker joined the University of Edinburgh in 2005 as Senior Lecturer and was appointed personal chair in neural development and regeneration in 2013. She was also the Director of Postgraduate Training at the Centre for Neuroregeneration up to 2015, then centre director up to 2017. In 2021 she received an Alexander von Humboldt Professorship, joining the Center for Regenerative Therapies Dresden at the Technical University of Dresden. She was elected Director of the Center for Molecular and Cellular Bioengineering in 2024.

== Research ==
Becker's research focuses on a better understanding of the factors governing the generation of neurons and axonal pathfinding in the CNS during development and regeneration using the zebrafish model to identify fundamental mechanisms in vertebrates with clear translational implications for CNS injury and neurodegenerative diseases. The Becker group established the zebrafish as a model for spinal cord regeneration. Their research found that functional regeneration is near perfect, but anatomical repair does not fully recreate the previous network, instead, new neurons are generated and extensive rewiring occurs. They have identified neurotransmitter signalling as one mechanism underlying regenerative neurogenesis. More recently, they have established larval regeneration paradigms in which highly selective cell ablation can be introduced and fundamental principles of functional repair, regenerative neurogenesis and rewiring can be analyzed. This system is scalable, allowing fast genetic screens into spinal cord repair.

Catherina Becker is on the executive board of the European Zebrafish Society EZB e.V. and on the advisory board of the International Society for Regenerative Biology ISRB.

== Awards ==
- 2014 Fellow Royal Society of Biology
- 2016 MRC LMS Suffrage Science Award (Life Sciences)
- 2016 Eurolife Distinguished Lecture
- 2021 Alexander-von-Humboldt Professorship
