= Tina Malti =

Canadian-German child psychologist

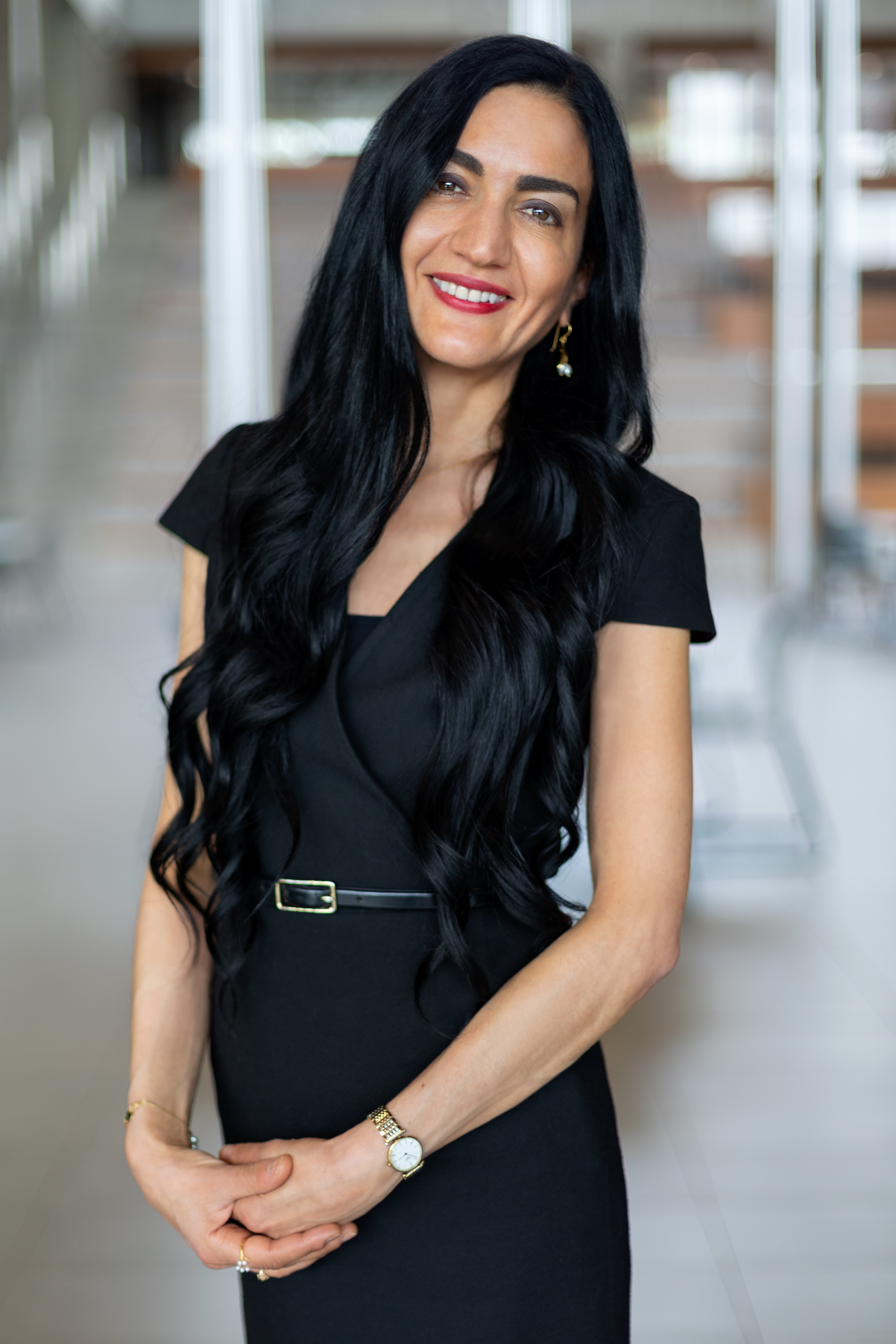
Malti, 2022

Tina Malti is the Mary Ainsworth Distinguished Professor of Child Development at the University of Toronto Mississauga, where she directs the Centre for Child Development, Mental Health, and Policy. She currently holds an Alexander von Humboldt Professorship and leads the Humboldt Science Center for Child Development (HumanKind) at Leipzig University. Tina is also the current president of the International Society for the Study of Behavioural Development (ISSBD).

She is known for her research on social-emotional development and mental health in children experiencing varying levels of adversity.

== Education ==
Tina Malti earned a Ph.D. in developmental psychology from the Max Planck Institute for Human Development and Free University of Berlin, under the supervision of Wolfgang Edelstein. She also obtained a postgraduate M.A. in clinical child psychology from the Academy of Cognitive Behaviour Therapy for Children and Adolescents in Switzerland and a Habilitation in psychology from Free University of Berlin. She is a registered psychologist.

== Research ==
=== Research expertise ===
Tina's research focuses on social-emotional development and mental health in children experiencing varying levels of adversity. Based on this work and a humanistic approach to child development, she creates and tests interventions that help children cultivate kindness and overcome the negative effects of exposure to violence, war, and trauma. To achieve these goals, Tina conducts and directs multidisciplinary research, training, and policy efforts that capitalize on inclusive principles and technological innovations to reach every child.

Tina is a co-editor of the Handbook of Child and Adolescent Aggression and the Cambridge Handbook of Prosociality. Her research has been profiled in The New York Times, The Atlantic, as well as other media outlets.

She and her team work closely with local and international communities and agencies to provide research-informed knowledge that can help nurture the development, wellbeing, and potential for kindness in children from all walks of life. Her work has been funded by all three federal funding agencies in Canada, the Public Health Agency of Canada, as well as international foundations and funding agencies. Her multi-cultural team has published over 250 publications in the areas of child development, mental health, and intervention research. Malti has been included annually since 2020 in the Stanford University/Elsevier list of the world's top 2% scientists.

=== Leadership ===
In 2019, Malti founded the Centre for Child Development, Mental Health, and Policy at the University of Toronto Mississauga, where she serves as the founding director. In 2024, she became founding director of the Humboldt Science Centre for Child Development (HumanKind) at Leipzig University.

From 2022 to 2026, Malti served as president of the International Society for the Study of Behavioural Development (ISSBD), an international organization dedicated to research on human development across the lifespan.

== Selected honours and awards ==
2026 – International Fellowship Award, Society for Research on Adolescence

2025 – Laurea Magistrale Honoris Causa in Pedagogical Sciences, Pegaso University, Italy

2024 – Fellow, Canadian Academy of Health Sciences

2023 – Alexander von Humboldt Professorship, Alexander von Humboldt Foundation

2019 – Desmond Morton Research Excellence Award, University of Toronto Mississauga

2019 – Fellow, American Psychological Association, Division 53

2015 – Fellow, American Psychological Association, Division 7

2015 – Fellow, Association for Psychological Science

2012 – Early Researcher Award, Ontario Ministry of Research and Innovation

2010 – Young Investigator Award, Society for Research on Adolescence

== Selected publications ==
Malti, T., & Speidel, R. (2024). Development of prosociality and the impacts of adversity. Nature Reviews Psychology. https://doi.org/10.1038/s44159-024-00328-7

Yavuz, M.H., Galarneau, E., Colasante, T., & Malti, T. (2024). Empathy, sympathy, and emotion regulation : A meta-analysis. Psychological Bulletin, 150 (1), 27–44. doi: 10.1037/bul0000426.

Malti, T., & Davidov, M. (Eds.) (2023). The Cambridge handbook of prosociality. Development, mechanisms, promotion. Cambridge, UK: Cambridge University Press.

Peplak, J., Bobba, B., Hasegawa, M., Caravita, S.C.S., & Malti, T. (2023). The warm glow of kindness: Developmental insight into children's moral pride across cultures and its associations with prosocial behavior. Developmental Psychology, 59(12), 2320–2332. https://doi.org/10.1037/dev0001613

Malti, T., & Speidel, R. (2022). Prosocial cascades: Understanding and nurturing the potential for positive developmental trajectories. Advances in Child Development and Behavior. https://doi.org/10.1016/bs.acdb.2022.10.002

Colasante, T., Jambon, M., Gao, X., & Malti, T. (2021). A process model linking physiological arousal and fear recognition to aggression via guilt in middle childhood. Development and Psychopathology, 33(1), 109–121. https://doi.org/10.1017/S0954579419001627

Malti, T. (2020). Children and violence: Nurturing social-emotional development to promote mental health. Social Policy Report (SPR). Society for Research in Child Development (SRCD), 33(2), 1-27. https://doi.org/10.1002/sop2.8

Malti, T. (2020). Kindness: A perspective from developmental psychology. European Journal of Developmental Psychology, 18(5), 629–657. https://doi.org/10.1080/17405629.2020.1837617

Malti, T., & Cheah, C.S.L. (2021). Towards complementarity: Specificity and commonality in social-emotional development. Child Development, 92(6), e1085-e1094. https://doi.org/10.1111/cdev.13690

Malti, T., & Rubin, K. H. (Eds.) (2018). Handbook of child and adolescent aggression. New York: Guilford Press.
