= Élisabeth Décultot =

Élisabeth Décultot (French: [elizabɛt dekylto]; born 13 May 1968 in Fécamp, Département Seine-Maritime, France) is a French Germanist, art historian and literary scholar. Since February 2015 she has held an Alexander von Humboldt Professorship at the Martin Luther University of Halle-Wittenberg. Since September 2020 she has been managing director of the Interdisciplinary Center for Research on the European Enlightenment

== Life ==
From 1986 to 1988 Élisabeth Décultot completed a Studium generale (classe préparatoire) at the Lycée Henri-IV in Paris and in 1988 she passed the entrance examination to the École normale supérieure. She then studied German and Romance studies from 1988 to 1992 at the École normal supérieure (Paris, Rue d'Ulm), at Paris-Sorbonne University, and at the Free University of Berlin. After completing the state examination in German studies (Agrégation) and studying at the University of Göttingen (1993), Décultot became a student at the University of Paris 8 Vincennes-Saint-Denis in 1995, supervised by Jacques Le Rider for her work Le discours sur la peinture de paysage dans le romantisme allemand. Fondements et enjeux d’un débat esthétique autour de 1800. In 2004 she completed her habilitation at the University of Paris VIII with the thesis Histoire du discours sur l'art. France-Allemagne (1750-1850).

From 1993 to 1996, Élisabeth Décultot was a lecturer and researcher at the Département d'études germaniques at the University of Paris 8. From 1996 to 2005 she was a researcher (Chargée de recherche) at the French National Centre for Scientific Research (CNRS) in the Pays germaniques und Transferts culturels section of the Paris École normale supérieure. From 2005, she was a research professor (Directrice de recherche) at the École normale supérieure (2005–2009), at the Centre Marc Bloch in Berlin (2009–2011), and at the Centre Georg Simmel of the School for Advanced Studies in the Social Sciences in Paris (2011–2014).

In the 2007–2008 academic year Décultot was visiting professor of the Elite Network Bavaria at the University of Augsburg. From 2008 to 2010 she was a research fellow in the Alexander von Humboldt Foundation at the University of Cologne and at the Humboldt University of Berlin. In 2008 she was a visiting scholar at the Max Planck Institute for the History of Science in Berlin.

In 2017 she gave the Classicisms Lecture at the University of Chicago.

Since February 2015, Élisabeth Décultot has been the Alexander von Humboldt Professor in the German department and the Interdisciplinary Center for Research on the European Enlightenment (IZEA) at the Martin Luther University of Halle-Wittenberg. In 2020 she refused a call to the University of Hamburg.

Décultot is a member of the board of directors of the IZEA, the Center for Classical Research, the Scientific Advisory Board of the Research Center Sanssouci, the Scientific Advisory Board of the German Center for Art History and the Dessau-Wörlitz Commission.

Elisabeth Décultot is married and has two children.

== Research ==
- History of art theory, art historiography and aesthetics in the 18th–19th centuries with special consideration of European knowledge transfer
- Scholarly reading and writing practices from the early modern period to the present day
- German Enlightenment, Classical and Romantic literature in a European context

== Projects and research collaborations ==
- 2006–2008: Klassizistisch-romantische Kunst(t)räume. Imaginationen im Europa des 19. Jahrhunderts und ihr Beitrag zur kulturellen Identitätsfindung, research conferences funded by the DFG, the Maison des Sciences de l’Homme (Paris) and the Villa Vigoni, in cooperation with the University of Bergamo and the University of Göttingen.
- 2009–2013: Ästhetik. Geschichte eines deutsch-französischen Ideentransfers (1750–1810)/Esthétique. Histoire d’un transfert franco-allemand (1750-1810); DFG/ANR-project in cooperation with the University of Göttingen.
- 2012–2014: Poétique et politique du récit historique, funded by the vom Centre interdisciplinaire d’études et de recherches sur l’Allemagne (CIERA, Paris) in cooperation with the School for Advanced Studies in the Social Sciences (Paris), the Martin Luther University of Halle-Wittenberg, Paderborn University, the Franco-German University, the University of Paris 8 Vincennes-Saint-Denis, and the German Historical Institute Paris.
- 2014–: with Hans Adler (University of Wisconsin–Madison): Edition of the collected writings of Johann Georg Sulzer

== Exhibitions ==
- 2010/2011 Musées de papier. L'Antiquité en livres, 1600–1800. Musée du Louvre Paris.

Catalog: Musées de papier. L'Antiquité en livres, 1600–1800, Editions du Musée du Louvre/Gourcuff-Gradenigo, Paris 2010.

- 2016/2017 Winckelmann. Moderne Antike.[Modern Antiquity] Neues Museum Weimar.

Katalog: als Hrsg. mit Martin Dönike, Wolfgang Holler, Claudia Keller, Thorsten Valk und Bettina Werche: Winckelmann. Moderne Antike, München 2017.

== Scholarships and awards ==
- 2008–2010 Humboldt fellowship for advanced scientists
- 2014 award of an Alexander von Humboldt Professorship by the Humboldt Foundation
- 2019 Member of the Saxon Academy of Sciences and Humanities

== Publications ==
Monographs

- Peindre le paysage. Discours critique et renouveau pictural dans le romantisme allemand, Tusson 1996.
- Johann Joachim Winckelmann. Enquête sur la genèse de l’histoire de l’art, Paris 2000.
- Untersuchungen zu Winckelmanns Exzerptheften. Ein Beitrag zur Genealogie der Kunstgeschichte im 18. Jahrhundert, Ruhpolding 2005.

Editions

- as editor with Michel Espagne und Michael Werner: Johann Georg Wille: Briefwechsel, Max Niemeyer Verlag, Tübingen 1999.
- Johann Joachim Winckelmann: De la description, Macula, Paris 2006 (introduction, translation, and commentary by E. Décultot)
