= Yong P. Chen =

American physicist and engineer

Yong P. Chen is an internationally-active physicist and engineer known for his work in quantum materials, nanoscience, and quantum technologies.

== Education ==
Chen studied mathematics as an undergraduate student in Xi’an Jiaotong University, and as a graduate student in Fudan University and MIT. He then received his PhD in electrical engineering from Princeton University in 2005, and did postdoctoral work at Rice University from 2005-2007.

== Career ==
Chen joined Purdue University in 2007 as the Miller Family Assistant Professor of Nanoscience and Physics. He advanced to Associate Professor (2012–2016) and later full Professor in 2016 with joint appointments in Physics, Astronomy, and Electrical and Computer Engineering. He held the positions of Karl Lark-Horovitz Professor of Physics and Astronomy and Professor of Electrical and Computer Engineering at Purdue University, and the inaugural Director of the Purdue Quantum Science and Engineering Institute from 2019 to 2025. He also served as Associate Director for Research at Purdue’s Birck Nanotechnology Center (2018–2019).

Chen has been a Villum Investigator and Professor at Aarhus University (2019–), and worked as a Principal Investigator at Tohoku University’s Advanced Institute for Materials Research (2017–present) and a Distinguished Professor in Institute for Materials Research. He also held visiting or Chair professorship roles at the Macau University of Science and Technology (2020–2024, named a VP International in 2026) and has also been a Global Scholar in VIN University (2025) and a Visiting Professor at Brown University (2026).

== Awards and honors ==
- Alexander von Humboldt Professorship with University of Kassel, Germany (2027)
- Fellow of the American Association for the Advancement of Science (2024)
- Herbert N. McCoy Award, Purdue University (2021)
- Villum Investigator, Denmark (2019)
- Fellow of the American Physical Society (2016)
- Masao Horiba Awards, Japan (2015)
- NSF CAREER Award (2009–2014)
- IBM Faculty Award (2009)
