= Sharon Macdonald =

British anthropologist

Sharon Jeanette Macdonald (born in 1961) is a British anthropologist and museologist.

== Career ==
In 1987, Macdonald received her Ph.D. from the University of Oxford and subsequently held posts at Brunel University and Keele University. From 1996 until 2002, she was a lecturer, then from 2002 to 2005 a reader in cultural anthropology, both at the University of Sheffield. From 2006 to 2012, she held a position as professor of social anthropology at the University of Manchester. In 2011, she was a visiting professor at Peking University. She was appointed as Anniversary Professor of Cultural Anthropology at the University of York in 2012. There, she was a co-investigator and led the "Profusion" theme in the Heritage Futures research project. In 2015, she accepted an Alexander von Humboldt professorship at the Humboldt University of Berlin.

She established the Centre for Anthropological Research on Museums and Heritage (CARMAH), funded by the Prussian Cultural Heritage Foundation, the Museum of Natural History Berlin, the Alexander von Humboldt Foundation, and the Humboldt University of Berlin.

She is a professor at the Institute for European Ethnology at the Humboldt University of Berlin. She is a fellow of the Royal Anthropological Institute of Great Britain and Ireland and the Royal Historical Society.

=== Research ===
Macdonald's research is focused particularly on how societies mediate their heritage through museum exhibitions. In Germany, she studied this in relation to Nazism in Nuremberg, promoted by a Humboldt scholarship from 2000 until 2006. More recently, she has focused on the representation of Islam in museums, alongside more general topics of looting and colonialism in museums.
