= Margaret Crofoot =

American anthropologist (born 1980)

Margaret "Meg" Chatham Crofoot
- Born: 1980 (age 45–46); Belfast, Maine
- Education: Stanford University; Harvard University
- Scientific career
- Workplaces: University of California, Davis; Smithsonian Tropical Research Institute; Princeton University; Max Planck Institute for Ornithology; University of Konstanz
- Thesis: Intergroup competition in white-faced capuchin monkeys (Cebus capucinus) : automated radio-telemetry reveals how intergroup relationships shape space-use and foraging success (2008)

Margaret Chatham Crofoot (born 1980) is an American anthropologist who is a professor at the University of Konstanz and the Max Planck Institute of Animal Behavior. Her research considers the behavior and decision making of primates. She was appointed an Alexander von Humboldt Professor in 2019.

== Early life and education ==
Crofoot was born in Belfast, Maine. She was an undergraduate student at Stanford University where she worked alongside Robert Sapolsky and Nancy Czekala, investigating the Buceros bicornis (the great hornbill). She moved to Harvard University as a graduate student. Her doctoral research considered competition amongst white faced capuchin monkey.

In 2008, Crofoot joined Princeton University as a lecturer in evolutionary biology. She worked simultaneously as a postdoctoral fellow at the Max Planck Institute for Ornithology and the Smithsonian Tropical Research Institute. At the time she served as Director of Automated Radio Telemetry System Initiative.

== Research and career ==
Crofoot was made a research associate at the Smithsonian Tropical Research Institute in 2010. She moved to the University of California, Davis in 2013, where she joined the faculty in the Department of Anthropology. She investigated primates: from the behavior of baboons to the competition of capuchins. She was particularly interested in decision-making amongst monkeys, including how baboons make decisions and how capuchins cooperate. To monitor the behavior of primate troops, Crofoot makes use of GPS tracking units. By attaching accelerometers to the baboons, Crofoot conducted the first detailed study of the movement and associated energetic costs of a group of wild primates. She combined experimental observations to computational predictions of how the groups would look if the baboons all moved at their own pace. She reported that all baboons compromise their preferred speed to keep their groups together, with the smallest baboons consuming the most energy to do so. She showed that larger male baboons with long legs move with longer strides than juveniles.

Crofoot joined the University of Konstanz and the Max Planck Institute of Animal Behavior in 2019. She was made a Alexander von Humboldt Foundation Fellow and serves as Director of the department for the Ecology of Animal Societies.

In 2021, Crofoot and fifteen other women scientists told the stories of sexual harassment they endured during their research experiences at the Smithsonian Tropical Research Institute. She first visited the institute during her graduate studies, but it was during her postdoctoral fellowship that Egbert Leigh confessed to being "madly in love" with her. Crofoot made a formal complaint to the Director (Eldredge Bermingham), who imposed restrictions upon Leigh, but they were barely enforced when Bermingham left a few years later.

== Awards and honors ==
- 2016 Packard Fellowship in Science and Engineering
- 2018 Alexander von Humboldt Professorship

== Selected publications ==
- Roland Kays; Margaret C Crofoot; Walter Jetz; Martin Wikelski (June 1, 2015). "ECOLOGY. Terrestrial animal tracking as an eye on life and planet". Science. 348 (6240) aaa2478. doi:10.1126/SCIENCE.AAA2478. ISSN 0036-8075. PMID 26068858.
- Ariana Strandburg-Peshkin; Damien R. Farine; Iain Couzin; Margaret C Crofoot (June 1, 2015). "GROUP DECISIONS. Shared decision-making drives collective movement in wild baboons". Science. 348 (6241): 1358–1361. Bibcode:2015Sci...348.1358S. doi:10.1126/SCIENCE.AAA5099. ISSN 0036-8075. PMC 4801504. PMID 26089514.
- Margaret C Crofoot; Ian C Gilby; Martin C Wikelski; Roland W Kays (January 9, 2008). "Interaction location outweighs the competitive advantage of numerical superiority in Cebus capucinus intergroup contests". Proceedings of the National Academy of Sciences of the United States of America. 105 (2): 577–581. Bibcode:2008PNAS..105..577C. doi:10.1073/PNAS.0707749105. ISSN 0027-8424. PMC 2206578. PMID 18184811.
