= Daniela Tuninetti =

Information theorist

Daniela Tuninetti (born 1973) is an information theorist whose research topics have included web caches, collision channels in wireless networks, cognitive interference channels, and electromyography. Tuninetti was educated in Italy and France and has worked in Switzerland and the US; she is a professor of electrical and computer engineering and head of the Department of Electrical and Computer Engineering, at the University of Illinois Chicago.

== Education and career ==
Tuninetti is originally from Carmagnola, in Italy, where she was born in 1973. She earned a master's degree in electrical engineering in 1998 at the Polytechnic University of Turin, with research supervised by Ezio Biglieri. She completed a Ph.D. in 2002 through Télécom Paris, working with Giuseppe Caire in Eurecom in Sophia Antipolis. Her doctoral dissertation was On Multi-access Block-Fading Channels.

After postdoctoral research from 2002 to 2004 at the École Polytechnique Fédérale de Lausanne in Switzerland, in the laboratory of Bixio Rimoldi, she joined the University of Illinois Chicago in the Department of Electrical and Computer Engineering. She was an assistant professor until 2011, an associate professor from 2011 to 2016, and has been a full professor since 2016. She became interim department head in 2019 and has been the department head since 2021.

== Recognition ==
Tuninetti was a distinguished lecturer of the IEEE Information Society from 2020 to 2022. She was named an IEEE Fellow, in the 2021 class of fellows, "for contributions to the theory of repetition protocols and wireless interference management".
