= Jens Meiler =

German biochemist (born 1974)

- Born: August 31, 1974 (age 52); Leipzig, East Germany
- Education: University of Leipzig (B.S., 1995); University of Frankfurt (Ph.D., 2001)
- Known for: Computational biology, structural chemistry
- Awards: Vanderbilt University Chancellor Faculty Fellow (2015); Alexander von Humboldt Professorship (2019)
- Scientific career
- Doctoral advisor: Christian Griesinger (Ph.D.), David Baker (Postdoc)
- Website: www.meilerlab.org

Jens Meiler (born August 31, 1974) is a German-American biologist and structural chemist. He currently serves as a Professor of Chemistry and Associate Professor of Pharmacology and Biomedical Informatics at Vanderbilt University. His research focuses on protein structures and computational biology, drawing on interdisciplinary techniques from other sciences.

== Biography ==
Meiler was born in Leipzig, East Germany. He attended the University of Leipzig, where he received a B.S. in biology in 1995. He then continued onto the University of Frankfurt receiving a Ph.D. in structural biology in 2001, where he was funded by the German National Merit Foundation scholarship. His doctoral adviser was Christian Griesinger, Director of the Max Planck Institute for Biophysical Chemistry. Meiler then completed his post-doctoral work in the same field through the Human Frontier Science Program at the University of Washington from 2001 to 2004. His postdoctoral adviser was David Baker, the Henrietta and Aubrey Davis Endowed Professor in Biochemistry, University of Washington.

After completing a postdoctoral fellowship, Meiler served as an Assistant Professor of Chemistry, Pharmacology, and Biomedical Informatics at Vanderbilt University. In 2011, he received tenure and was promoted to Associate Professor. During this time, he received the Vanderbilt Institute for Chemical Biology Prize for Highly Cited Article award (2014).

In 2019, Meiler was awarded the Alexander von Humboldt Professorship from the Alexander von Humboldt Foundation his research in bioinformatics and protein structures. As part of the award, Meiler collaborated with colleagues at Leipzig University on the study of G-protein coupled receptors. He was also named the Stevenson Chair in Chemistry. At Vanderbilt, his lab conducts research on cheminformatics, Ligand docking, and protein design. It is funded by a number of national organizations, including the National Science Foundation and the National Institutes of Health.

The Meiler Lab at Vanderbilt University specializes in computational, structural, and chemical biology. Their focus is on protein-protein interactions, protein design, ligand docking, and cheminformatics. Their findings on small-molecule therapeutics and receptor-binding proteins have been published in academic journals like Nature. In recent years, Meiler has also conducted research on artificial intelligence. His work has been featured in newspapers in both the United States and Germany.

== Honors and awards ==
- 2019 Alexander von Humboldt Professorship from the Alexander von Humboldt Foundation
- 2015 Vanderbilt University Chancellor Faculty Fellow
- 2014 Vanderbilt Institute for Chemical Biology Prize for Highly Cited Article
- 2002–2005 Human Frontier Science Program postdoctoral fellowship
- 1998–2001 Kekulé Scholarship, German Chemical Industry Association
- 1994–1998 German National Merit Foundation scholarship

== Personal life ==
Jens Meiler lives in Nashville, Tennessee and Leipzig, Germany.

== Notable publications ==
- Martin, Eric; Knapp, Stefan; Engh, Richard A.; Moebitz, Henrik; Varin, Thibault; Roux, Benoit; Meiler, Jens; Berdini, Valerio; Baumann, Alexander; Vieth, Michal (October 2015). "Perspective on computational and structural aspects of kinase discovery from IPK2014". Biochimica et Biophysica Acta (BBA) - Proteins and Proteomics. 1854 (10): 1595–1604. doi:10.1016/j.bbapap.2015.03.014. PMC 5105597. PMID 25861861.
- Kroncke, Brett M.; Vanoye, Carlos G.; Meiler, Jens; George, Alfred L.; Sanders, Charles R. (15 April 2015). "Personalized Biochemistry and Biophysics". Biochemistry. 54 (16): 2551–2559. doi:10.1021/acs.biochem.5b00189. PMC 4415889. PMID 25856502.
- Alexander, Nathan S.; Preininger, Anita M.; Kaya, Ali I.; Stein, Richard A.; Hamm, Heidi E.; Meiler, Jens (January 2014). "Energetic analysis of the rhodopsin–G-protein complex links the α5 helix to GDP release". Nature Structural & Molecular Biology. 21 (1): 56–63. doi:10.1038/nsmb.2705. PMC 3947367. PMID 24292645.
- Combs, Steven A.; DeLuca, Samuel L.; DeLuca, Stephanie H.; Lemmon, Gordon H.; Nannemann, David P.; Nguyen, Elizabeth D.; Willis, Jordan R.; Sheehan, Jonathan H.; Meiler, Jens (July 2013). "Small-molecule ligand docking into comparative models with Rosetta". Nature Protocols. 8 (7): 1277–1298. doi:10.1038/nprot.2013.074. PMC 5750396. PMID 23744289.
