= Heike Vallery =

German mechanical engineer

Heike Vallery is a German mechanical engineer whose research involves the development of robot legs and exoskeletons to assist in human walking, including applications in prosthetics and medical rehabilitation. She is a professor of biomechanical engineering at Delft University of Technology in the Netherlands, and Alexander von Humboldt Professor at RWTH Aachen University.

== Education and career ==
Vallery was a student of mechanical engineering at RWTH Aachen University, earning a diploma there in 2004, after which she earned a doctorate (Dr. Ing.) from Technical University of Munich in 2009.

She was a postdoctoral researcher at ETH Zürich and an assistant professor at Khalifa University before becoming a faculty member at Delft University of Technology in 2012.

She added an affiliation as honorary professor at Erasmus MC, a medical research center in Rotterdam, in 2019. She was named as an Alexander von Humboldt Professor at RWTH Aachen University, with a joint affiliation between Delft and Aachen, in 2022. She is currently Head of the Institute of Automatic Control at RWTH Aachen University, successing Dirk Abel.
