= Anke Hoeffler =

German economist and political scientist

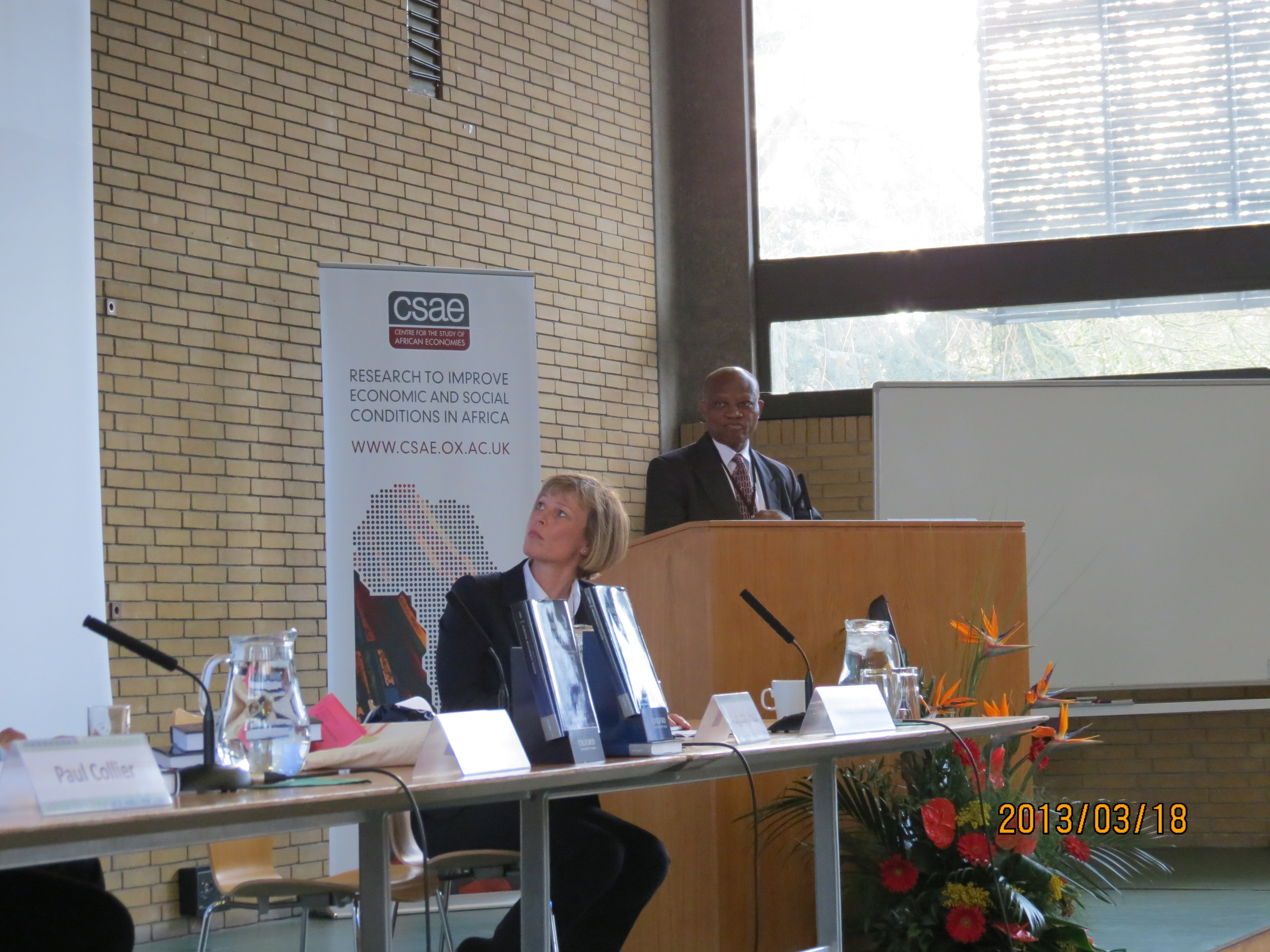
- Anke Hoeffler (centre) during a panel discussion at the University of Oxford in 2013
- Born: 1 November 1967 (age 59)
- Education: University of Würzburg; Birkbeck, University of London; University of Oxford
- Occupations: Economist, political scientist
- Employer: University of Konstanz
- Known for: Research on development, violence and civil war

Anke Elisabeth Hoeffler (born 1 November 1967) is a German-British social scientist. She is Professor of Political Science at the University of Konstanz, where she holds an Alexander von Humboldt Professorship.

Her research addresses the causes and consequences of civil war and interpersonal violence, and their relationship to economic development. With Paul Collier, she developed the "greed and grievance" framework (Greed versus grievance) for the quantitative study of civil war onset; the resulting paper was named a Current Classic in Economics & Business by Thomson Reuters' ScienceWatch.com in February 2010.

In 2024 she was elected a member of the Leopoldina, the German National Academy of Sciences.

== Education ==
Hoeffler studied economics in Würzburg (Diplom, 1991) and at Birkbeck College, University of London (MSc, 1993), before completing a DPhil in economics at Balliol College, University of Oxford (1999).

== Career ==
From 1999 to 2018, Hoeffler was a Research Officer at the Centre for the Study of African Economies at St Antony's College, Oxford, having previously held a part-time lectureship in economics at Balliol College.

In 2018, Hoeffler was awarded an Alexander von Humboldt Professorship, Germany's most highly endowed research prize. In 2019, she joined the University of Konstanz as an Alexander von Humboldt Professor and has since led the Development Research Group.

== Research ==
Hoeffler's DPhil was supervised by Paul Collier at Oxford, with econometric methodology co-supervised by Steve Bond (Nuffield College). Her subsequent decades-long research collaboration with Collier produced much of her most influential work on the economics of civil war, including the proposal that the onset of civil war is better explained by economic opportunities for rebellion than by political or ethnic grievances, a contribution that became known as the "greed and grievance" framework (Greed versus grievance) for the quantitative study of civil war onset.

Her doctoral research also addressed the use of Generalized Method of Moments (GMM) estimation in cross-country growth regressions. The resulting working paper with Bond and Jonathan Temple, "GMM Estimation of Empirical Growth Models" (2001), has been widely cited in the empirical growth literature. In single-authored work from this period, she examined the augmented Solow growth model's applicability to Africa and the role of trade openness and investment in African growth. This methodological work also fed into the broader literature on African economic growth, reflected in the edited volume The Political Economy of Economic Growth in Africa, 1960–2000 by Benno J. Ndulu, Stephen A. O'Connell, Robert H. Bates, Paul Collier and Chukwuma C. Soludo.

Hoeffler has published widely across development economics and political economy topics, including on the determinants and effectiveness of foreign aid, the relationship between democracy and economic performance in resource-rich states, the allocation of aid between need, merit, and donor self-interest, and, more recently, the drivers and character of Chinese foreign aid.

A more recent strand of her research, developed with James Fearon, quantifies and compares the global costs of interpersonal violence, including intimate partner violence and the physical punishment of children, with those of civil war and terrorism. This research is the subject of Worse than War: The Global Costs of Violence (Princeton University Press, 2026), co-authored with Fearon, which estimates that the global cost of interpersonal violence such as homicide and assault is around eight times higher than the cost of war and terrorism combined, and that the cost of non-fatal domestic violence against women and children alone exceeds the combined costs of homicide, assault, terrorism, and war.

== Personal life ==
Hoeffler is married and has two sons. Her father, Dietrich Höffler (1934–2020), was a German nephrologist and professor of medicine. Her brother, economist Felix Höffler (1970–2019), was Professor of Economics at the University of Cologne and director of the university's Institute of Energy Economics (EWI) until his death in 2019.

== Selected publications ==
- Collier, Paul; Hoeffler, Anke (2004-06-22). "Greed and grievance in civil war". Oxford Economic Papers. 56 (4): 563–595. doi:10.1093/oep/gpf064. ISSN 1464-3812.
- Hoeffler, Anke (2017). "What are the costs of violence?". Politics, Philosophy & Economics. 16 (4): 422–445. doi:10.1177/1470594X17714270. ISSN 1470-594X. S2CID 157187291.
- Bond, Stephen R.; Hoeffler, Anke; Temple, Jonathan R. W. (2001). GMM Estimation of Empirical Growth Models (Technical report). Centre for Economic Policy Research. SSRN 290522. 3048.
