= Greed versus grievance =

Causes of civil war

The phrase "greed versus grievance" or "greed and grievance" refers to the two baseline arguments put forward by scholars of armed conflict on the causes of civil war, though the argument has been extended to other forms of war, such as violent conflict in general, rebellion and insurgency, for example.

"Greed" is shorthand for the argument that combatants in armed conflicts are motivated by a desire to better their situation, and perform an informal cost-benefit analysis in examining if the rewards of joining a rebellion are greater than not joining. "Grievance" stands for the argument that people rebel over issues of identity, e.g. ethnicity, religion, social class, etc., rather than over economics. In practice, even proponents of strong versions of these arguments admit that the opposing argument has some influence in the development of a conflict.

Whether the cause of war is attributed to 'greed' or 'grievance' the common factor is the perception of a certain deprivation. If it is an economic deprivation, the inequality will be a 'vertical inequality' and the cause of war will be 'greed'. If the deprivation is caused by ethnicity, age, religion or gender, it will be a 'horizontal inequality' and the cause of war will be due to the 'grievances'.

== Cornerstones ==
The "greed versus grievance" theory provides opposing arguments on the cause of civil war. Proponents of the greed argument posit that armed conflicts are caused by a combatant's desire for self-enrichment. These motivations are manifested in multiple ways, including economic gain through control of goods and resources or by increased power within a given state. Conflicts started through greed are often seen in states with negative economic growth and/or systemic poverty, as this implies limited state capacity to provide opposition groups with economic concessions as well as the likelihood of the absence of an effective military or police apparatus to contend with those seeking power or resources.

=== Collier-Hoeffler Model ===
The strong case for the "greed" argument was made by Paul Collier and Anke Hoeffler in a study they performed for the World Bank in 2000. Since then, the Collier-Hoeffler Model has been the focus of much of the greed-grievance debate.

Paul Collier and Anke Hoeffler wrote one of the seminal pieces defending greed over grievance. They found that factors that increase the military or financial viability of rebellion correlated with more instances of conflict than factors leading to grievances. They argue that certain natural resources such as oil are tied to increased likelihood of conflict onset, and other natural resources such as diamonds are tied to increases in conflict duration. This is because natural resources may lower the startup cost of war, and provide rebels with an easy way of financing prolonged conflicts. Natural resources may also make the state a more lucrative prize for capture, further decreasing the opportunity cost of insurgency. For the same reason, Collier and Hoeffler also conclude that states with low per capita GDP are more likely to experience civil war, because low average income makes wage earning through conflict a more lucrative prospect. Collier and Hoeffler also make an important distinction between preferences and constraints in terms of circumstances that favor rebellions. Societies can be more prone to conflict because preferences for rebellion are unusually strong or because constraints on rebellion are unusually weak – the former being aligned with grievance and the latter with greed. Measures such as democracy or political repression are hard to draw conclusions from because they may increase grievances among some groups, but empower other groups to repress potential insurgents. While most states harbor some level of grievance with the sitting regime, few states experience civil war. This is because although not everyone is content with the established order, rebellion only occurs when conflict is a viable option for dissatisfied parties. Therefore, Collier and Hoeffler conclude that on their own, most variables that seek to explain civil war onset through measurements of grievance alone prove insufficient. Instead Collier and Hoeffler advocate using the looking at greed, that is to say the opportunity cost of initiating and sustaining conflict. Fearon and Laitin (2003) offer a contrasting view. They see opportunity structures created by weakness state capacity to be a cause of civil war onset. They find evidence in favor of the technology of insurgency as a mechanism. Further, they find that ethnicity, religion or any cultural or demography characteristic do not seem to have a positive relationship with civil war onset.

Financing combatants is crucial to the success of any rebellion. Extortion and donations from diasporas are two possible financial sources used by rebellion groups. The extortion of primary commodity resources is especially suited to the operations of rebel groups, as they are often made up of unskilled labor and given whatever weapons are available. As rebel organizations need to be fairly large to have a significant impact and incite a civil war, the looting of primary commodity resources is the best way for them to maintain financial viability. Examples of this include diamonds in Sierra Leone and Angola, timber in Cambodia, coca in Colombia, and poppy in Afghanistan. Another factor that relates to lower constraints on rebellion is that primary resources are often found in rural locales. Thus, they often require an army to defend a large area, something that is much less likely in weak states that cannot sustain a military apparatus. Diaspora populations are also likely funding sources for rebel groups, as was the case with the Tamil population in North America funding the Tamil Tigers in Sri Lanka. Diaspora populations, who are usually wealthier than their native counterparts, are able to mobilize for collective action, and do not directly suffer the consequences of a conflict. While the potential for diasporas to be financial backers of rebel groups was noted, Collier and Hoeffler found that diasporas themselves do not increase the risk of conflict.

Overall, Collier and Hoeffler's study drew multiple conclusions in support of the greed model. Faster economic growth reduces risk, likely because it raises the opportunity costs of joining a rebellion. The higher a state's dependence on primary commodities, the greater the risk of conflict; this is due to the resources being a main financial component of rebel groups and a weak governmental structure. However, they observed that if there is a particularly high dependence on primary commodity resources, conflict risk declines as states find ways to protect their resources and deter looting.

=== Criticism of the model ===
Probably one of the most coherent rebuttals of Collier's work on greed vs. grievance comes from the political economist David Keen. Keen elaborates on the economic incentives for warfare and argues that there is more to war than simply "winning." In some instances, it could be more beneficial for certain parties to prolong war, so long as they are in control of economic resources or power positions. This can become common in states with weak rule of law where violence becomes privatized. Elite groups within weak states attempt to harness economic agendas and resources within a given civil society and are motivated to create private profit by mobilizing violent means. Keen continues by citing various possible economic functions of violence.

His first example of violent means to promote economic gain is pillaging, whether to gain resources or to supplement or supply wages of soldiers. Another function is extortion of protection money from people who can afford it so they can be spared violence inflicted upon them. A third economic function is the monopolistic control of trade. When state control breaks down, trade that was previously prohibited is more easily facilitated and has the potential to generate substantial amounts of profit for those involved. Primary examples of this are weapons and drugs. A fourth function of conflict is the possible exploitation of labor. The threat of violence can be used to coerce cheap or free labor, with extreme cases resulting in forms of slavery. A fifth short-term function is the ability to stake a claim to land and its resources. Similar to Collier and Hoeffler's argument that weak states cannot easily maintain control over their natural resources due to their rural location and potentially wide dispersion, it is economically beneficial to assert control over minimally defended, resource-rich areas. Extracting benefits from aid that is sent to a conflict area is also beneficial for rebel groups as there are often possibilities to raid resources sent from abroad. Appropriation of aid becomes difficult in a weak state.

Unlike Collier, Keen does not attribute conflict to be driven more by greed than by grievance; he stresses how the two forces interact so that greed generates grievances and rebellion, which in turn legitimizes further greed. Keen uses the conflict perpetuated by Milosevic in Serbia as an example of how an extended, endless conflict is preferable to one with a definitive end and a clear winner. Milosevic controlled the media to create grievances among the Serbian population, rally them together, and create a common enemy following NATO bombing. The small group of elites surrounding Milosevic perpetuated conditions that warranted international sanctions in order to better control trade and loot resources. Milosevic realized sanctions were necessary to facilitate the profitable black market transactions that were being made by those closest to him. Had he demobilized or embraced a more peaceful policy, the sanctions would have been lifted and his economic advantage would have disintegrated. This is what Keen was referring to in his argument that greed and grievance are often tied together and interact with one another. In this way, Milosevic's initial desire for power spurred him to create grievances amongst the Serbs that created the popular support for his sanction-warranting policies to further his economic and political power – the use of grievances to produce further greed.

=== Case study: Afghanistan ===
In south central Asia, along the lawless Afghani-Pakistani border a group called the Taliban have been engaging in what could best be described as a greed based insurgency since 2001. The Taliban's insurgency is in opposition to the NATO and United States supported Afghan transitional government of Hamid Karzai. This brief case study will provide concrete examples of the factors that compose the Greed Model.

One of the primary characteristics of a Greed-based conflict as listed above is the ability to derive income or revenue from natural resource predation. This requires the presence of a "lootable" resource. In the case of the Taliban insurgency, this resource is the opium poppy. Afghanistan supplies the majority of the world's opium, the market share being as high as 90% in the years directly following the NATO invasion. The high volume, high revenue nature of the Afghan opium market allows the Taliban to "loot" the resource at every stage of development, from cultivation to heroin sale. Benefits from opium production begin for the Taliban with imposing a 10% tax on farmers growing opium (a protection fee), followed by control over heroin labs and heroin sales to smugglers. The Taliban, like FARC before them also blur the line between membership to the Taliban and membership to the transnational group of opium smugglers, therefore allowing the insurgency to reap financial rewards from the price bump that comes when the smuggler crosses an international border. In these ways the Taliban are able to fund their insurgency and begin to fall under the characterization of a group of actors in pursuit of greed based conflict.

A second component of the Greed Model is the presence of a large diaspora funding the conflict. If we use the traditional definition of a diaspora, the Taliban do not have one. However, they have two extraterritorial means of support based on ethnic affiliation. One comes from funding from wealthy Arabs in the Middle East. This revenue source has been relatively under-researched as the funds are coming from individuals rather than an ethnic bloc.

Contrasting the diffuse nature of the Arab funding, the Taliban receive considerable support from their Pakistani Pashtun brethren. Pashtun influence has a large impact on the Afghan insurgency. Pakistan's role encompasses a number of characteristics important to the greed model; ethnic homogeneity, a supply of unskilled labor, and lawless borderlands. Collier and Hoeffler discuss the idea that diversity makes conflict more difficult as it is harder to mobilize a heterogeneous ethnic base into rebellion. However, the Pashtun ethnic group that straddles the Afghani-Pakistani border is anything but diverse. This allows the Taliban to rapidly acquire recruits. In addition, many Pashtuns in the region are uneducated and poor. This provides the Taliban with another requirement for greed based rebellion; unskilled workers who can fill out security and infantry requirements. The insecurity and lack of formal state governance over the Afghan south-east and the Pakistani west also makes a significant contribution to the robustness of a greed based argument here. The mountainous region between the two states is an ideal hiding place for insurgents and also provides many circuitous avenues for smuggling heroin.

Pakistan's influence in Afghanistan extends beyond the simple trans-border ethnic affiliation. Gretchen Peters cites a strained relationship with its Pakistani neighbors as a problem limiting the success of the Karzai government. Pakistan's government is hostile towards the Afghan transitional government because the transitional government is backed and heavily influenced by international entities. Therefore, the Inter-Service Intelligence Agency (ISI) of Pakistan has been known to directly support the Taliban with funding, tip offs, and the corruption of government officials. This constitutes the greed model factor of extraterritorial governmental support for an insurgency laid out by Collier.

The final explanatory feature important to the Taliban's insurgency as a greed-based rebellion is the influence of a previous rebellion. With the support of the CIA and ISI the young Taliban in the 1990s were pitted against the Soviet Union in proxy war. This enabled the Taliban to do a number of things. They became involved in opium trade, were provided with weapons, and began to construct the organizational aptitude that allows for their continued success today. The previous involvement of the Taliban in an armed insurgency allows one of the issues with a greed-based insurgency to be dismissed. Collier and Hoeffler assert that the government has an innate advantage in greed-based conflicts as the government is more organized. However, in the case of the Afghan conflict this is not true. The transitional government is more fractionalized, less cooperative, and more ethnically divided than the Taliban. Therefore, using the greed-model we should actually expect the Taliban to defeat the transitional government after NATO's withdrawal, as the government possesses few advantages.

This case shows the explanatory power of the greed model, enabling a better understanding of what the variables look like in the real world. In the Afghan case there haven't been many successes in peace building. As the following section will illustrate, the greed model is not without holes or needed additions, but the Taliban insurgency can definitively be characterized as an actor motivated primarily by the conditions that foster the greed model.

=== Case study 2: Sri Lanka ===
Sri Lanka is an island country in South Asia that suffered from a violent civil war for more than 25 years. The fighting took place between the majority of the Buddhist Sinhalese population and the minority Hindu Tamils. This brief case study will demonstrate how the civil war was caused by horizontal inequalities and how it therefore supports the 'grievance' argument.

Injustices can be seen across different ethnic groups. When the people from a certain ethnic group perceive that they are being given less opportunities by the government simply because they belong to that ethnic group, in terms of education and economy for example, it creates grievances. These grievances, which are called horizontal inequalities, lead to violent conflict. The war that took place in Sri Lanka was due to the perceived grievances that the Tamil population experienced during Sinhalese rule.

Sri Lanka – then called Ceylon – was under British colonial rule from 1815 to 1948. Even though the majority of the population was Buddhist Sinhalese, with over three million people, the British favored the Hindu Tamils, who accounted for 300,000 people. The Tamil population therefore enjoyed privileged access to education and to government employment. They held around 40% of university places in science and engineering, medicine and agriculture and veterinary science. The appointment of Tamils to bureaucratic positions angered the Sinhalese population and when Great Britain granted Ceylon independence in 1948, the Sinhalese majority aimed at correcting these horizontal inequalities perceived as disadvantageous to them. They made Sinhalese the official language, which drove the Tamils out of the civil service and incorporated educational quotas. The result was an increase in Sinhalese incomes and a drop in those of the Tamil, which eliminated the previous differential between the two groups. However, by the end of the 1970s, the Sinhalese were gaining more places at universities and because civil service recruitment policies, such as the use of Sinhalese in examinations favored the Sinhalese, their recruitment in relation to population was four times more favorable than that of the Tamils.

While the initial aim was to correct the horizontal inequalities perceived by the Sinhalese population, the result was that instead of just being corrected, the inequalities became in favor of the Sinhalese. This meant that the Tamil population now felt economically and politically excluded and threatened. As seen, these horizontal inequalities translated into grievances and it was these grievances that allowed extremist leaders to exploit the growing resentment to gain support and start a violent conflict.

After years of ethnic tensions, the violence was initiated by an insurgent group called the Tamil Tigers, who declared the ‘First Eelam War (1983-87) with the aim of creating a separate Tamil state in northern Sri Lanka. The peacekeepers sent by India in 1987 did little to stop the violence and they were forced to retire in 1990. It was then that the Tamil Tigers initiated what they called the second Eelam War, which was even bloodier than the first. Horrible atrocities were committed by both sides, including the use of child suicide bombers and child soldiers and it was not until 2009 that the Sri Lankan government declared victory over the Tamil Tigers. It is estimated that at least 100,000 died during the conflict.

In this situation, the Tamil Tigers did not start violent conflict due to greed. It was grievances such as a perceived disadvantage over education possibilities, work opportunities, language use and economic prospects that increased the ethnic tensions between the two groups and drove the Tamil Tigers to start a war.

While there is no doubt that war causes poverty and that once war has broken out it feeds on economic deprivation and underdevelopment, one cannot declare the ‘greed’ argument as a sole explanation of violent conflict. Poverty does not cause war directly, so the greed argument is not strong enough. It is the grievances perceived by a group within a society that drives violent conflict. These grievances do include economic deprivation but also ethnic discrimination, age and gender. As seen with Sri Lanka, these factors are more likely to drive conflict since they also provide a specific environment where charismatic leaders can pick on the grievances and create a sense of group membership that facilitates the outbreak of war.

=== Critiques ===
There are many works that rebut the idea of greed vs. grievance. Authors set up alternative ideas that need to be introduced and explored. Even the staunchest proponents of the Greed vs. Grievance theory believe that other outside forces (beyond the greed and/or grievance) can have an effect on conflict, which makes the critiques all the more vital in understanding the theory itself.

One of the leading critics on the 'greed' argument is Frances Stewart. In her article "Horizontal Inequalities: A neglected Dimension of Development", she stresses the need to focus on the grievances of the populations, since too much focus on inequality between individuals is dangerous for successful development. By using nine case studies she proves how horizontal inequalities have led to violent conflict.

David Keen, a professor at the Development Studies Institute at the London School of Economics, has several innovative and new ideas regarding the ideas of war. His work is considered by many to be one of the leading arguments against greed vs. grievance theory. His ideas look into the specifics of complex emergencies, which is a term officially defined by the Inter-Agency Standing Committee (IASC) as:

A multifaceted humanitarian crisis in a country, region or society where there is a total or considerable breakdown of authority resulting from internal or external conflict and which requires a multi-sectoral, international response that goes beyond the mandate or capacity of any single agency and/or the ongoing UN country program. Such emergencies have, in particular, a devastating effect on children and women and call for a complex range of responses.

In his book, Complex Emergencies, Keen discusses how a conflict can never be simply a greed scenario. His definition of a "complex emergency" demonstrates this broader term and all of its various implications. He goes into several different conflict scenarios, such as 'war', 'famine', and 'information', and then sets up an argument against the idea of greed. He believes that although a conflict, whether it be the 'War on Terror' or the conflict in Sierra Leone, may be centered around some concept of greed or grievance, this can never solely explain a conflict. Although seemingly obvious, Keen looks to demonstrate that, "the aims in a war are complex". He does not believe that greed and grievance can be examined separately, but rather that they are partner terms that must be implemented in a complementary way. For example, when Keen discusses the conflict in Sudan, he says, " the grievances of northern pastoralists were useful for a government trying to get its hands on oil in areas that famine and militia attacks helped to depopulate; meanwhile, the 'greed' of the Arab militias themselves (for labour, cattle and land) was itself intimately linked to their grievances". He makes it clear that it is necessary to first spend ample time defining the type of conflict at hand because the differences between genocide and a civil war are substantial, so it is necessary to diagnose the incentives and solutions for the conflict with a mix of multiple theories.

Keen specifically critiques Paul Collier, by claiming that Collier became too comfortable with "numbers", and needed to rely more on the actual opinions of people involved in conflicts. He spoke of Collier's work and said, "This is where econometrics tips over into arrogance and starts closing down the possibility of a genuine understanding of conflicts or, by extension, of a political settlement that addresses underlying grievances". He doesn't believe that it can be dismissed so easily. He was documented saying, "It also annoys me that a lot of the 'scientific air' of the Collier work is quite bogus as the selection of proxies is so arbitrary", which demonstrated a distinct attack on Collier's work, which emphasizes quantitative data.

Keen argues the point that a conflict, although he cannot define it, cannot be pinpointed to simply one motive. He believes that conflicts are much more complex and thus should not be analyzed through simplified methods. He disagrees with the quantitative research methods of Collier and believes a stronger emphasis should be put on personal data and human perspective of the people in conflict. This isn't necessarily a complete dismissal of the greed vs. grievance theory, but rather a critique on its polarity and methods of data collection.

Beyond Keen, several other authors have introduced works that either disprove greed vs. grievance theory with empirical data, or dismiss its ultimate conclusion. Cristina Bodea and Ibrahim Elbadawi, for example, co-wrote the entry, "Riots, coups and civil war: Revisiting the greed and grievance debate," and argue that empirical data can disprove many of the proponents of greed theory and make the idea "irrelevant". They examine a myriad of factors and conclude that too many factors come into play with conflict, which therefore cannot be confined to simply greed or grievance.

Anthony Vinci makes a strong argument that, "fungible concept of power and the primary motivation of survival provide superior explanations of armed group motivation and, more broadly, the conduct of internal conflicts".
