= Gerard J. van den Berg =

Dutch econometrician

Gerhardus Johannes "Gerard" van den Berg (born 1962) is a Dutch econometrician. He is professor of economics at the Vrije Universiteit Amsterdam and the University of Bristol. He was awarded the 2009 Alexander von Humboldt Professorship at the University of Mannheim. His research lies in the fields of health economics and labour markets.

== Career ==
Van den Berg was born in 1962. He obtained a BA in econometrics at the University of Groningen in 1983, the next year he also obtained a BA in philosophy. He obtained a further MA in econometrics at the same university in 1985. Van den Berg earned his doctorate at Tilburg University in either 1988 or 1990.

After completing his studies Van den Berg was an assistant professor at the University of Groningen until 1993. Afterwards he moved to the Vrije Universiteit Amsterdam where he was an associate professor until 1996 and subsequently a full professor. In 2009 he won the Alexander von Humboldt Professorship of the Alexander von Humboldt Foundation and moved to the University of Mannheim. The prize entailed a 3.5 million-euro reward to be spent during a five-year professorship.

In 2010 Van den Berg was elected a corresponding member of the Royal Netherlands Academy of Arts and Sciences. He has been a fellow of the Econometric Society since 2013.

In April 2024 van den Berg was awarded Officier van Oranje Nassau

Van den Berg has been a research fellow at the Institute for the Study of Labor since 1999. He is a member of the scientific council of the Institute for Employment Research since 2014.

The research of Van den Berg is diverse, dealing with diverse components of health economics and labour markets. He also works on evaluation of (government) policy interventions.
