= William Crawley-Boevey =

English mathematician

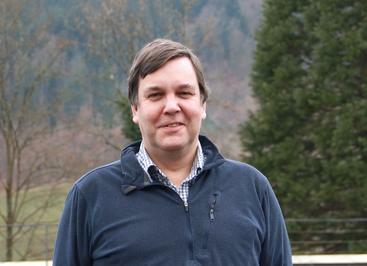
William Crawley-Boevey at Oberwolfach, 2014

William Walstan Crawley-Boevey (born 1960) is an English mathematician. Since 2016, he has been Alexander von Humboldt Professor at Bielefeld University, on leave from his position as Professor of Pure Mathematics at the University of Leeds. His research concerns representation theory and the theory of quivers.

Crawley-Boevey is the second son of Sir Thomas Crawley-Boevey, 8th Baronet. He studied at the City of London School and read mathematics at St John's College, Cambridge. He received his PhD in 1986 from the University of Cambridge under the supervision of Stephen Donkin. Before his appointment in Leeds, he held post-doctoral positions at the University of Liverpool and the University of Oxford.

He was the 1991 winner of the Berwick Prize of the London Mathematical Society. In 2006, Crawley-Boevey presented an invited talk at the International Congress of Mathematicians. In 2012, he became one of the inaugural fellows of the American Mathematical Society.

== Selected publications ==
- Crawley-Boevey, W. W. (1988), "On tame algebras and bocses", Proceedings of the London Mathematical Society, Third Series, 56 (3): 451–483, doi:10.1112/plms/s3-56.3.451, MR 0931510.
- Crawley-Boevey, William; Holland, Martin P. (1998), "Noncommutative deformations of Kleinian singularities", Duke Mathematical Journal, 92 (3): 605–635, doi:10.1215/S0012-7094-98-09218-3, MR 1620538.
- Crawley-Boevey, William (2001), "Geometry of the moment map for representations of quivers", Compositio Mathematica, 126 (3): 257–293, doi:10.1023/A:1017558904030, MR 1834739.
