= Psychological Bulletin =

- Discipline: Psychology
- Language: English
- Edited by: Stefan G. Hofmann

Publication details
- History: 1904–present
- Publisher: American Psychological Association (United States)
- Frequency: Bimonthly
- Impact factor: 19.8 (2024)

Standard abbreviations
- ISO 4: Psychol. Bull.

Indexing
- CODEN: PSBUAI
- ISSN: 0033-2909
- LCCN: 05019164
- OCLC no.: 1681351

Links
- Journal homepage; Online access

The Psychological Bulletin is a monthly peer-reviewed academic journal that publishes evaluative and integrative research reviews and interpretations of issues in psychology, including both qualitative (narrative) and/or quantitative (meta-analytic) aspects. The outgoing editor-in-chief is Blair T. Johnson and the incoming one is Stefan G. Hofmann.

== History ==
The journal was established by Johns Hopkins psychologist James Mark Baldwin in 1904, immediately after he had bought out James McKeen Cattell's share of Psychological Review, which the two had established ten years earlier. Baldwin gave the editorship of both journals to John B. Watson, when scandal forced him to resign his position at Johns Hopkins in 1920. Ownership of the Bulletin passed to Howard C. Warren, who eventually donated it to the American Psychological Association, which continues to own it to the present day.

== Abstracting and indexing ==
The journal is abstracted and indexed by MEDLINE/PubMed, the Social Sciences Citation Index, and the Science Citation Index. According to the Journal Citation Reports, the journal has a 2024 impact factor of 19.8.
