= Angela Schoellig =

German computer scientist

Angela P. Schoellig is a German computer scientist whose research involves the application of machine learning to the control theory of robot motion, especially for quadcopters and other flying devices. She is an Alexander von Humboldt Professor for Robotics and Artificial Intelligence at the Technical University of Munich, and an associate professor in the University of Toronto Institute for Aerospace Studies (UTIAS).

== Education and career ==
After high school in Backnang, near Stuttgart, Schoellig studied engineering science and mechanics in the US at Georgia Tech, earning a master's degree there in 2007 under the supervision of Magnus Egerstedt. She returned to Germany for a second master's degree in engineering cybernetics at the University of Stuttgart, in 2008, working there with Frank Allgöwer. She completed a doctorate in 2013 at ETH Zurich in Switzerland, with Raffaello D'Andrea as her doctoral advisor.

After continued postdoctoral research at ETH Zurich, she became an assistant professor at the University of Toronto in 2013, was given a Canada Research Chair in 2019, and was promoted to associate professor in 2020. In 2021 she was given the Alexander von Humboldt Professorship in Artificial Intelligence at the Technical University of Munich, where she holds the Chair of Safety, Performance and Reliability for Learning Systems in the Department of Computer Engineering.
