= Sebastian Deindl =

German-Swedish molecular biophysicist, biochemist, and structural biologist

Sebastian Deindl (born March 16, 1978 in Basel) is a German-Swedish biochemist, molecular biophysicist and structural biologist. In November 2024, Sebastian Deindl was selected for an Alexander von Humboldt professorship.

== Education and career ==
Sebastian Deindl studied biochemistry at the University of Tübingen, where he became familiar with structural biology. He completed his degree in 2004 with a diploma. In 2009, he earned his Ph.D. at the University of California, Berkeley, under the supervision of John Kuriyan. During this time, his research focused on the biophysical mechanisms of signal transduction and the structure of protein complexes.

After completing his Ph.D., Deindl worked from 2009 to 2014 as a Jane Coffin Childs postdoctoral fellow at the Department of Chemistry and Chemical Biology at Harvard University, where he was part of Xiaowei Zhuang's research group. There, he developed single-molecule techniques and applied them to the study of chromatin dynamics.

In 2014, Deindl assumed an assistant professorship at Uppsala University. He was promoted to associate professor in 2018 and appointed full professor of Molecular Biophysics in 2021. At Uppsala University, he leads a research group in the field of mechanistic chromatin biology, which investigates the complex molecular structures and dynamics of nucleic acid-binding proteins and their collective role in regulating gene expression, particularly in the chromatin context. In 2024, he was selected for an Alexander von Humboldt Professorship, Germany’s most highly endowed research award. In this role, Deindl is expected to take up the Chair of Structural Biology at the Interfaculty Institute of Biochemistry (IFIB) at the University of Tübingen.

== Honors and awards ==
- 2017: ERC Starting Grant
- 2019: EMBO Young Investigator Award
- 2022: ERC Advanced Grant
- 2024: Alexander von Humboldt professorship

== Selected publications ==
- Aguirre Rivera, J.; Mao, G.; Sabantsev, A.; Panfilov, M.; Hou, Q.; Lindell, M.; Chanez, C.; Ritort, F.; Jinek, M.; Deindl, S. (2024-08-23). "Massively parallel analysis of single-molecule dynamics on next-generation sequencing chips". Science. 385 (6711): 892–898. Bibcode:2024Sci...385..892A. doi:10.1126/science.adn5371. PMID 39172826.
- Bacic, Luka; Gaullier, Guillaume; Mohapatra, Jugal; Mao, Guanzhong; Brackmann, Klaus; Panfilov, Mikhail; Liszczak, Glen; Sabantsev, Anton; Deindl, Sebastian (2024-02-02). "Asymmetric nucleosome PARylation at DNA breaks mediates directional nucleosome sliding by ALC1". Nature Communications. 15 (1) 1000. Bibcode:2024NatCo..15.1000B. doi:10.1038/s41467-024-45237-8. ISSN 2041-1723. PMC 10837151. PMID 38307862.
- Marklund, Emil; Mao, Guanzhong; Yuan, Jinwen; Zikrin, Spartak; Abdurakhmanov, Eldar; Deindl, Sebastian; Elf, Johan (2022-01-28). "Sequence specificity in DNA binding is mainly governed by association". Science. 375 (6579): 442–445. Bibcode:2022Sci...375..442M. doi:10.1126/science.abg7427. PMID 35084952.
- Marklund, Emil; Van Oosten, Brad; Mao, Guanzhong; Amselem, Elias; Kipper, Kalle; Sabantsev, Anton; Emmerich, Andrew; Globisch, Daniel; Zheng, Xuan; Lehmann, Laura C.; Berg, Otto G.; Johansson, Magnus; Elf, Johan; Deindl, Sebastian (2020-07-23). "DNA Surface Exploration and Operator Bypassing During Target Search". Nature. 583 (7818): 858–861. Bibcode:2020Natur.583..858M. doi:10.1038/s41586-020-2413-7. PMID 32581356.
- Bowman, Gregory D.; Deindl, Sebastian (2019-10-04). "Remodeling the genome with DNA twists". Science. 366 (6461): 35–36. Bibcode:2019Sci...366...35B. doi:10.1126/science.aay4317. PMID 31604293.
- Sabantsev, Anton; Levendosky, Robert F.; Zhuang, Xiaowei; Bowman, Gregory D.; Deindl, Sebastian (2019-04-12). "Direct observation of coordinated DNA movements on the nucleosome during chromatin remodelling". Nature Communications. 10 (1) 1720. Bibcode:2019NatCo..10.1720S. doi:10.1038/s41467-019-09657-1. ISSN 2041-1723. PMC 6461674. PMID 30979890.
- Hwang, William L.; Deindl, Sebastian; Harada, Bryan T.; Zhuang, Xiaowei (August 2014). "Histone H4 tail mediates allosteric regulation of nucleosome remodelling by linker DNA". Nature. 512 (7513): 213–217. Bibcode:2014Natur.512..213H. doi:10.1038/nature13380. ISSN 1476-4687. PMC 4134374. PMID 25043036.
- Deindl, Sebastian; Kadlecek, Theresa A.; Brdicka, Tomas; Cao, Xiaoxian; Weiss, Arthur; Kuriyan, John (2007-05-18). "Structural Basis for the Inhibition of Tyrosine Kinase Activity of ZAP-70". Cell. 129 (4): 735–746. doi:10.1016/j.cell.2007.03.039. PMID 17512407.
