= Alexandre Obertelli =

French experimental nuclear physicist

Alexandre Obertelli (born 10 April 1978 in Paris) is a French experimental nuclear physicist and Alexander von Humboldt Professor of Experimental Nuclear Structure Physics at the Institute of Nuclear Physics of the Technische Universität Darmstadt.

His research areas include radioactive nuclei and antimatter.

== Life ==
Obertelli studied Physics at the University of Paris XI from 1999. He graduated with a Master's degree in 2002. He earned a PhD in Nuclear Physics in 2005 (La fermeture de sous-couche N=16) from the Institute of research into the fundamental laws of the Universe (IRFU) of the Fundamental Research Division of the Saclay Nuclear Research Centre. He was a postdoctoral fellow at the National Superconducting Cyclotron Laboratory (NSCL) at Michigan State University. In 2006, he returned to IRFU for research. In 2011, he habilitated at the University of Paris XI. In 2013/14 he became a fellow of the Japan Society for the Promotion of Science at Riken. In 2017 he joined the Institute of Nuclear Physics of the Technische Universität Darmstadt. In 2019, he became Alexander von Humboldt Professor.

He is a member of the User Executive Committee of the Radioactive Isotopes Beam Factory (RIBF) of Riken and co-spokesperson of the SEASTAR Collaboration. In 2018 he became a member of the scientific council of the R3B (Reactions with relativistic radioactive rays) project group at the Facility for Antiproton and Ion Research (FAIR) in Darmstadt. He is a member of the scientific steering committees of the Grand Accélérateur National d'Ions Lourds (GANIL) and the Institute of Nuclear Physics (IPN) in Orsay.

== Research ==
He deals with spectroscopy of radioactive nuclei, for which he developed new methods. Starting in 2010, he investigated short-lived nuclei with inbeam gamma spectroscopy at the RIBF of RIKEN. The vertex tracker MINOS, a target container made of liquid hydrogen with a compact time projection chamber, was developed for this purpose. Obertelli used it, among other things, to search for exotic nuclei with new magic numbers. He is the speaker of the PUMA (antiProton Unstable Matter Annihilation) experiment, in which neutron skins and halos around neutron-rich medium-heavy nuclei (as an example of low-density neutron matter) are studied with antiprotons.

== Awards ==
He received the ERC Starting Grant in 2010 and the ERC Consolidator Grant in 2018. A year later, he received the Alexander von Humboldt Professorship from the Alexander von Humboldt Foundation, the highest endowed research award in Germany with a grant of five million euros.
