= Friedrich Eisenbrand =

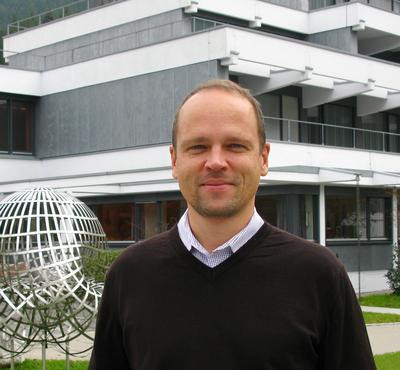
- Eisenbrand at Oberwolfach, 2011
- Education: Saarland University
- Awards: Heinz Maier-Leibnitz-Preis, Otto Hahn Medal
- Scientific career
- Fields: Mathematical optimization, Mathematics
- Workplaces: École Polytechnique Fédérale de Lausanne
- Doctoral advisor: Alexander Bockmayr

Friedrich Eisenbrand (born 3 July 1971 in Quierschied, Saarland) is a German mathematician and computer scientist. He is a professor at EPFL Lausanne working in discrete mathematics, linear programming, combinatorial optimization and algorithmic geometry of numbers.

Eisenbrand received his PhD at Saarland University in 2000. He gave a talk at the International Congress of Mathematicians in Seoul in 2014.

Prior to joining EPFL in March 2008, Friedrich Eisenbrand was at the University of Paderborn. He received the Heinz Maier-Leibnitz Prize of the German Research Foundation in 2004 and the Otto Hahn Medal of the Max Planck Society in 2001. Eisenbrand was awarded Alexander von Humboldt Professorship in 2012.
