= Hannes Leitgeb =

German philosopher

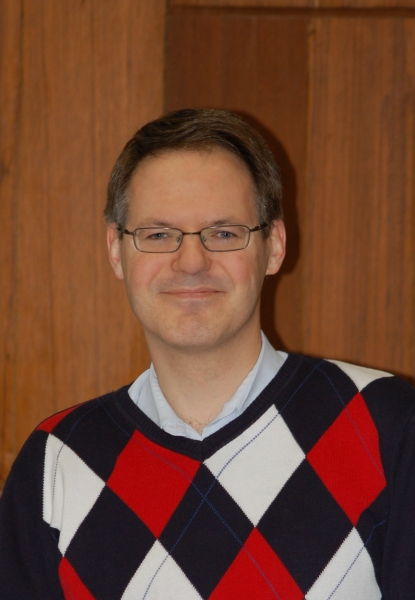
Leitgeb in 2012

Hannes Leitgeb (born 26 June 1972, Salzburg) is an Austrian philosopher and mathematician. He is Professor of Philosophy at LMU Munich and has received a Humboldt Professorship in 2010.

His areas of research include logic (theories of truth and modality, paradox, conditionals, nonmonotonic reasoning, dynamic doxastic logic), epistemology (belief, inference, belief revision, foundations of probability, Bayesianism), philosophy of mathematics (structuralism, informal provability, abstraction, criteria of identity), philosophy of language (indeterminacy of translation, compositionality), cognitive science (symbolic representation and neural networks, metacognition), philosophy of science (empirical content, measurement theory), and history of philosophy (logical positivism, Carnap, Quine).

Leitgeb studied mathematics at the University of Salzburg and graduated with a master's degree in 1997. After his PhDs in mathematics (1998) and philosophy (2001), also in Salzburg, he was offered a position as assistant professor at the university's faculty of philosophy. In 2003, he received an Erwin Schrödinger Scholarship by the Austrian Science Fund to do research at Stanford University Department of Philosophy/CSLI. From 2005 on, he worked at the Departments of Philosophy and Mathematics at the University of Bristol. Two years later, he became Professor of Mathematical Logic and Philosophy of Mathematics.

In autumn 2010, he took up an invitation to occupy the Chair of Logic and Philosophy of Language at LMU Munich, where he became director of the Munich Center for Mathematical Philosophy.

In 2016, Leitgeb became a member of the German Academy of Sciences Leopoldina. In 2025, he received the Gottfried Wilhelm Leibniz Prize.
