= Vincent C. Müller =

Professor of Philosophy

Education
- Education: University of Marburg; King's College London; Hamburg University

Philosophical work
- Era: 21st-century philosophy
- Region: Western philosophy
- School: Analytic philosophy
- Institutions: University of Erlangen–Nuremberg
- Website: www.sophia.de

Vincent C. Müller is a German philosopher. His research focuses on the nature and future of computational systems, mainly on the philosophy and ethics of AI.

== Education ==
Müller studied at the universities of Marburg, Hamburg, London and Oxford. He completed his doctorate from the University of Hamburg in 1999.

== Career ==
He is Alexander von Humboldt Professor for ethics and philosophy of AI at the University of Erlangen-Nuremberg (FAU), Turing Fellow at the Alan Turing Institute, president of the European Association for Cognitive Systems, and chair of the euRobotics topics group on 'ethical, legal and socio-economic issues'. He was Stanley J. Seeger Fellow at Princeton University, James Martin Research Fellow at the University of Oxford, and Professor at the TU Eindhoven. He is the Director of Centre for Philosophy and AI Research (PAIR) at University of Erlangen-Nuremberg.

== Sources ==
- 2013 Interview
- 2022 Podcast "Deep Minds" (German)
