= Giuseppe Caire =

Italian telecommunications engineer

- Born: 1965 (age 60–61)
- Education: Princeton University (1992, MSc); Politecnico di Torino (1994, PhD)
- Known for: Information Theory; Wireless communications
- Awards: Leibniz Prize (2021); Alexander von Humboldt Professorship (2014); IEEE Fellow (2005)
- Scientific career
- Fields: Electrical Engineering
- Workplaces: Technische Universität Berlin; University of Southern California
- Doctoral students: Daniela Tuninetti

Giuseppe Caire (born 1965 in Turin) is an Italian telecommunications engineer.

== Career ==
Caire received his B.Sc. in electrical engineering from Politecnico di Torino in 1990, his M.Sc. in electrical engineering from Princeton University in 1992, and his Ph.D. from Politecnico di Torino in 1994. He was a post-doctoral research fellow with the European Space Agency (ESTEC) from 1994 to 1995. He has been an assistant professor in telecommunications at the Politecnico di Torino from 1995 to 1997, an associate professor at the University of Parma from 1997 to 1998, and a full professor with the Department of Mobile Communications at the Eurecom Institute from 1998 to 2005. In 2005 he became a professor of electrical engineering with the Viterbi School of Engineering at the University of Southern California. Since 2014 he is an Alexander von Humboldt Professor and head of the chair of communications and information theory at Technische Universität Berlin. He is also working on practical applications at the Fraunhofer Institute for Telecommunications (Heinrich Hertz Institute). Since 2020 he is a principal scientist at the Berlin Institute for the Foundations of Learning and Data (BIFOLD).

He served as associate editor for the IEEE Transactions on Communications from 1998 to 2001 and as associate editor for the IEEE Transactions on Information Theory from 2001 to 2003. He served on the board of governors of the IEEE Information Theory Society from 2004 to 2007, was an officer of the society from 2008 to 2013, and was president of the IEEE Information Theory Society in 2011.

== Research ==
Caire is one of the world's most frequently cited and leading experts on communications engineering and information theory. His current research interests have a particular focus on wireless communications and include:

- Information Theory
- Channel Coding
- Source Coding
- Machine Learning for Communication Networks
- Wireless Communication Systems
- Coded Caching for massive Content Distribution

== Awards ==
Clarivate Highly Cited Researcher in the category Computer Science 2014, 2018, 2019, 2020, 2021, and 2022.

- 2024 Elected member of the German National Academy of Sciences Leopoldina
- 2023 IEEE Communications Society Communication Theory Technical Committee (CTTC) Technical Achievement Award
- 2022 Elected member of the Berlin-Brandenburg Academy of Sciences and Humanities
- 2021 Gottfried Wilhelm Leibniz Prize
- 2020 IEEE Communications Society Edwin Howard Armstrong Achievement Award
- 2019 Leonard G. Abraham Prize for Best IEEE JSAC Paper
- 2018 ERC Advanced Grant
- 2015 Vodafone Innovations Award
- 2014 Alexander von Humboldt Professorship
- 2011 IEEE Communications Society & Information Theory Society Joint Paper Award
- 2006 Okawa foundation research award
- 2005 IEEE Fellow
- 2004 IEEE Communications Society & Information Theory Society Joint Paper Award
- 2003 Jack Neubauer Best System Paper Award from the IEEE Vehicular Technology Society
