= Sahika Inal =

Turkish scientist

- Education: Free University of Berlin; Istanbul Technical University; University of Potsdam
- Scientific career
- Workplaces: École nationale supérieure des mines de Saint-Étienne; King Abdullah University of Science and Technology
- Thesis: Responsive polymers for optical sensing applications (2014)

Sahika Inal is a Turkish bioengineer. She is appointed as an Alexander von Humboldt Professor at TU Dresden in Germany. She is an associate professor and Chair of the Organic Bioelectronics Laboratory at King Abdullah University of Science and Technology. She is interested in the use of organic electronic materials for monitoring health, and the design of biocompatible devices that can interface with the human body. In 2021, she was shortlisted for the Nature Portfolio Scientific Achievement award.

== Early life and education ==
Inal was an undergraduate at Istanbul Technical University, where she studied textile engineering. She moved to the Free University of Berlin, Technical University of Berlin, Humboldt University of Berlin for graduate research and focused on polymer science. Her master's dissertation considered optical processes in organic solar cells. Inal stayed in Germany for her doctoral research, moving to the University of Potsdam where she studied responsive polymers for optical sensing. As part of this work she worked on phase transition polymer: polyelectrolytes. After earning her doctorate, she moved to the École nationale supérieure des mines de Saint-Étienne, in Saint-Étienne, France, where she worked as a postdoctoral researcher.

== Research and career ==
In 2021, Inal was appointed an associate professor at the King Abdullah University of Science and Technology, where she leads the Organic Bioelectronics group. Inal works with organic electronic materials for bioelectronics, and the development of spectroscopic and structural probes to monitor the movement of electrons and ions.

In particular, she is interested in ionic-electronic conduction and the use of organic electronics to detect small biological signals. Inal has developed several electronic devices, including; optical devices for pathogen diagnostics, conducting polymer scaffolds for cell culture, electrochemical transistors and electrophoretic devices for localised drug delivery.

In 2022 Inal has been named a Fellow of the Royal Society of Chemistry (RSC) in recognition of her pioneering work in the field of medical diagnostics. In May 2026 Inal was appointed Alexander von Humboldt Professor at TU Dresden and Leibniz Institute of Polymer Research Dresden.

== Selected publications ==
- Menny Shalom; Sahika Inal; Christian Fettkenhauer; Dieter Neher; Markus Antonietti (7 May 2013). "Improving carbon nitride photocatalysis by supramolecular preorganization of monomers". Journal of the American Chemical Society. 135 (19): 7118–7121. doi:10.1021/JA402521S. ISSN 0002-7863. PMID 23647353.
- Jonathan Rivnay; Sahika Inal; Brian A. Collins; et al. (19 April 2016). "Structural control of mixed ionic and electronic transport in conducting polymers". Nature Communications. 7 11287. Bibcode:2016NatCo...711287R. doi:10.1038/NCOMMS11287. ISSN 2041-1723. PMC 4838877. PMID 27090156.
- Steve Albrecht; Silvia Janietz; Wolfram Schindler; et al. (29 August 2012). "Fluorinated copolymer PCPDTBT with enhanced open-circuit voltage and reduced recombination for highly efficient polymer solar cells". Journal of the American Chemical Society. 134 (36): 14932–14944. doi:10.1021/JA305039J. ISSN 0002-7863. PMID 22861119.
