= Dagmar Divjak =

Linguist

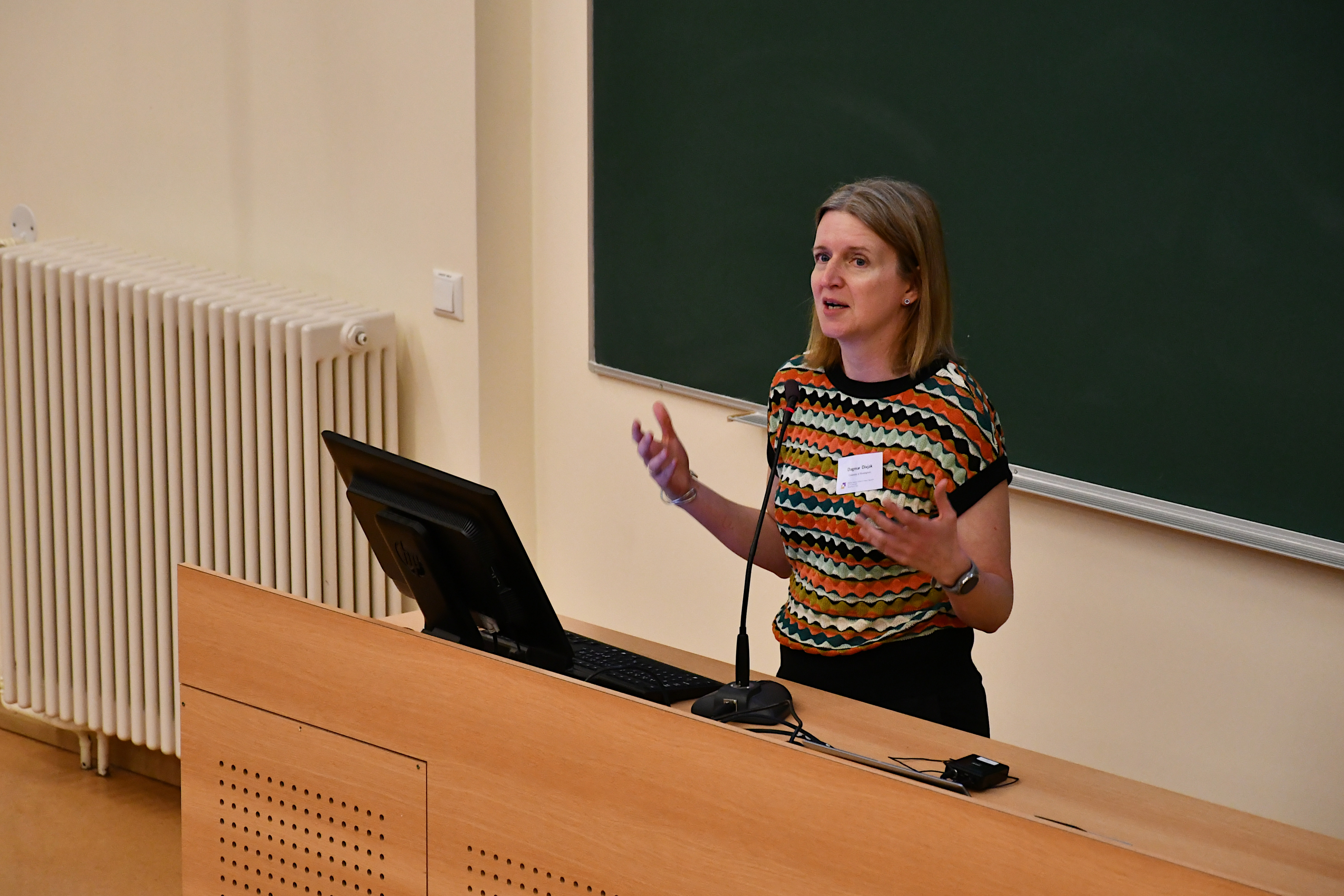
- Dagmar Divjak teaching at the Summer School in Corpus Linguistics 2023, Tartu, Estonia

Dagmar Divjak (born 1975) is a linguist who is professor at the University of Birmingham, specializing in corpus linguistics and cognitive linguistics.

== Education, career and honours ==
Divjak studied at KU Leuven. She initially studied East European Languages & Cultures, receiving a BA in 1995 and an MA in 1997 along with an MA in Academic Teacher Training. After a study visit to the Jagiellonian University in Kraków in 1998, she pursued a PhD in East European Languages and Cultures along with Linguistics, which was awarded in 2004; the title of her doctoral dissertation was Degrees of Verb Integration: Conceptualizing and Categorizing Events in Russian.

After her doctorate she held postdoctoral positions at the University of North Carolina at Chapel Hill (2004–5) and at KU Leuven (2005–6). In 2006 she took up a position as lecturer at the University of Sheffield, where she was promoted to Senior Lecturer in 2011, Reader in 2012, and full professor in 2018. Since 2019 she has been Professorial Research Fellow in Cognitive Linguistics and Language Cognition at the University of Birmingham.

Divjak has served as vice-president (2010–2014) and then president (2014–2017) of the Slavic Cognitive Linguistics Association. In 2020 she was elected ordinary member of the Academia Europaea.

== Research ==
Divjak's research agenda is to achieve a better understanding of how the structures and patterns we observe in language emerge from human and individual cognitive capacities. Her approach can be situated within usage-based and cognitive linguistics. She has worked on topics in morphology, syntax, lexical semantics and language learning, and has employed methods from corpus linguistics as well as experimental linguistics. Her recent research has received funding from the British Academy and the Leverhulme Trust.

== Selected publications ==
- Divjak, Dagmar & Stefan T. Gries. 2006. Ways of trying in Russian: clustering behavioral profiles. Corpus Linguistics and Linguistic Theory 2 (1), 23–60. doi:10.1515/CLLT.2006.002
- Gries, Stefan T. & Dagmar Divjak. 2009. Behavioral profiles: a corpus-based approach to cognitive semantic analysis. In Vyvyan Evans & Stephanie Pourcel (eds.), New directions in cognitive linguistics, 57–75. ISBN 9789027223784
- Divjak, Dagmar. 2010. Structuring the lexicon: a clustered model for near-synonymy. Berlin: Walter de Gruyter. ISBN 9783110220599
- Divjak, Dagmar, & Antti Arppe. 2013. Extracting prototypes from exemplars: What can corpus data tell us about concept representation? Cognitive Linguistics 24 (2), 221–274. doi:10.1515/cog-2013-0008
- Dabrowska, Ewa, & Dagmar Divjak (eds.). 2015. Handbook of cognitive linguistics. Berlin: de Gruyter Mouton. doi:10.1515/9783110292022
- Divjak, Dagmar. 2019. Frequency in language: memory, attention and learning. Cambridge: Cambridge University Press. ISBN 9781107085756
