= Till Winfried Bärnighausen =

Researcher, professor and institute director

Till Winfried Bärnighausen (born 1969) is an Alexander von Humboldt University Professor and Director of the Heidelberg Institute of Global Health at the Faculty of Medicine, University of Heidelberg, Germany. He is also Adjunct Professor of Global Health at the Department of Global Health and Population, Harvard T.H. Chan School of Public Health, a Faculty Member at the Harvard Center for Population and Development Studies, and a Senior Faculty at the Wellcome Trust's Africa Health Research Institute in South Africa.

== Biography ==
Till Bärnighausen is a German physician, epidemiologist, and academic. He is an Alexander von Humboldt Professor and Director of the Heidelberg Institute of Global Health (HIGH) at the Faculty of Medicine and University Hospital of Heidelberg University in Germany. He is also Senior Faculty at the Africa Health Research Institute (AHRI) in South Africa, a fellow of the Harvard Center for Population and Development Studies, and an adjunct professor of global health at the Harvard T.H. Chan School of Public Health.

Bärnighausen studied medicine at Ruprecht-Karls-Universität Heidelberg, completing his medical degree in 1997. In 1998, he received a doctoral degree in the history of medicine, with research focusing on human experimentation conducted by the Japanese military in China during the Second World War. He completed specialist training in internal medicine in 2002. He later earned a Master of Science in Health Systems Management from the London School of Hygiene and Tropical Medicine in 2001 and a master’s degree in economics and finance from the University of London in 2006. In 2008, he obtained a Doctor of Science (Sc.D.) in population and international health from the Harvard T.H. Chan School of Public Health.

From 2004, Bärnighausen was affiliated with the Africa Health Research Institute (AHRI) at the University of KwaZulu-Nata in South Africa, where he became an associate professor. In 2009, he was appointed professor at the Harvard T.H. Chan School of Public Health. In 2016, he returned to Germany to take up an Alexander von Humboldt Professorship at Heidelberg University, where he leads the Heidelberg Institute of Global Health.

His research focuses on population-based global health and on establishing the causal impact of health interventions on population health, as well as social and economic outcomes. His work includes the design and evaluation of large-scale interventions targeting conditions such as HIV, diabetes, hypertension, and vaccine-preventable diseases, using epidemiological, experimental, and quasi-experimental methods, as well as implementation and economic evaluation approaches.

Bärnighausen has authored more than 1,000 peer-reviewed publications in journals including The Lancet and its specialty titles, BMJ, Science, Science Translational Medicine, Nature, and Nature Medicine. His work has been cited more than 180,000 times and has a high h-index.

He has contributed to multiple international commissions, including several Lancet Commissions on topics such as diabetes in Africa, chronic obstructive pulmonary disease (COPD) in China, aging with HIV, universal health coverage, global health security, population medicine, dengue fever, and climate change and mental health. He currently co-chairs the Lancet Commission on the European Health Union.

In 2016, Bärnighausen was awarded the Alexander von Humboldt Professorship, one of Germany’s most highly endowed international research awards, granted by the Alexander von Humboldt Foundation in cooperation with the German Federal Ministry of Education and Research.

His research has been funded by a wide range of international organizations and agencies, including the United States National Institutes of Health, the European Union, the German Research Foundation (DFG), the Wellcome Trust, the World Health Organization (WHO), the World Bank, GAVI, USAID, UNAIDS, the Clinton Health Access Initiative, the International Initiative for Impact Evaluation (3ie), and several philanthropic foundations.
