= Dieter Schmalstieg =

Austrian computer scientist

- Education: TU Wien
- Known for: Computer graphics, Augmented Reality, Virtual Reality
- Awards: IEEE Fellow 2020, IEEE ISMAR Career Impact Award 2020
- Scientific career
- Fields: Computer graphics, Augmented reality, Virtual reality, Information visualization
- Workplaces: Graz University of Technology
- Doctoral advisor: Michael Gervautz
- Website: Dieter Schmalstieg at Graz University of Technology

Dieter Schmalstieg is an Austrian computer scientist, full professor, and head of the Institute of Computer Graphics and Vision (ICG) at Graz University of Technology. In 1993 he received a master of science diploma and in 1997 the degree of doctor of technical sciences. Currently he has over 300 peer-reviewed works which were cited over 20,000 times which brought him an h-index of 70.

He is the author of the book "Augmented Reality - Principles and Practice" (with Tobias Höllerer, ISBN 978-0321883575), published by Addison-Wesley in 2016 . A translation into Japanese appeared 2018.

== Publications ==
- Pose tracking from natural features on mobile phones, IEEE, 2008.
- ARToolkitPlus for pose tracking on mobile devices, Graz Technical University, 2007.
- First steps towards handheld augmented reality, IEEE, 2003.
- Mathematics and geometry education with collaborative augmented reality, ACM, 2002.
- The studierstube augmented reality project, MIT Press, 2002.
