= Walton T. Roth =

American psychiatrist and psychophysiological researcher

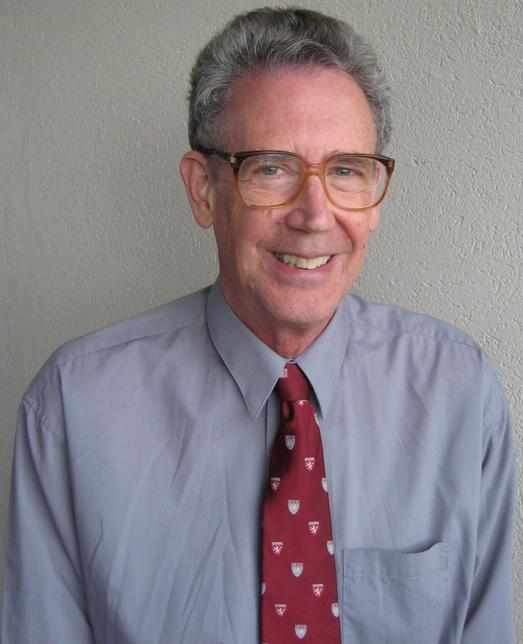
- Born: February 23, 1939; Topeka, Kansas
- Education: Harvard University, New York University School of Medicine
- Scientific career
- Fields: Psychophysiology, Psychiatry
- Workplaces: Stanford University School of Medicine, Veterans Affairs Palo Alto Healthcare System

Walton Thompson "Tom" Roth (born 1939 in Topeka, Kansas) is an American psychiatrist and psychophysiological researcher. He is Emeritus Professor of Psychiatry and Behavioral Sciences at the Stanford University School of Medicine, and was Chief of the Psychiatric Consultation Service at the Veterans Affairs Palo Alto Healthcare System for over 40 years.

== Major contributions ==
A wave showing several event-related potential components, including P300 (P3)

Roth and colleagues pioneered the use of multiple psychophysiological methods for assessing psychological disorders. Using electroencephalography-based event-related potentials (ERPs), Roth determined that people with schizophrenia have a reduced amplitude P300 component of the ERP to unexpected changes in the pitch of tones. This reduction of the P300 component is now considered a biomarker of schizophrenia.

Roth has also applied the use of skin conductance, electrocardiography, actigraphy, and monitoring of other physiological functions, such as respiration, to assess anxiety disorders.

In addition, Roth co-authored the Core Concepts in Health textbook series, as well as over 250 scholarly journal articles and book chapters.

Roth is currently semi-retired, but continues research work on the psychophysiology of hyperarousal and posttraumatic stress disorder, as well as ambulatory monitoring of sleep.

== Selected books ==
- Core Concepts in Health by Paul M. Insel and Walton T. Roth (originally published 1976, 11th edition McGraw-Hill 2009)
- Fit and Well: Core Concepts and Labs in Physical Fitness and Wellness by Thomas D. Fahey, Paul M. Insel, and Walton T. Roth (originally published 1994, 7th edition McGraw-Hill 2006)
- Treating Anxiety Disorders Walton T. Roth (Ed.), Irvin D. Yalom (contributor) (Jossey-Bass Library of Current Clinical Technique, 1997)

== Professional awards, honors, and service ==
- Special Issue in honor of Walton T. Roth: Psychophysiology of Psychological Disorders. International Journal of Psychophysiology, 2010.
- Society for Psychophysiological Research: Board of Directors 1985-1988, Associate Journal Editor of Psychophysiology, 1984-1987, 2003-2006.
- Editorial Board of journal: Anxiety (now Depression and Anxiety), 1994-2007.
- President of Psychiatric Research Society, 2001
- Lieutenant Commander of U.S. Public Health Service Commissioned Corps, 1969-1971
- Alpha Omega Alpha, Medical Honor Society, 1965

== Education and background ==
Roth attended Harvard University, alongside classmates Frank Ochberg and Barney Frank, and New York University School of Medicine. He completed his psychiatry residency at Stanford University School of Medicine.

Roth was born in Topeka, Kansas, but raised in Salt Lake City, Utah, the son of a Presbyterian minister and a high school teacher. Roth and his wife, Jean, have been married since 1963 and reside in Los Altos Hills, California. They have two children. Roth is also fluent in German and Norwegian.
