= Yaochu Jin =

Optimization researcher

Yaochu Jin was born in Wujiang, Jiangsu Province, China in 1966. He received the B.Sc., M.Sc., and Ph.D. degrees from Zhejiang University, Hangzhou, China, in 1988, 1991, and 1996, respectively, and the Dr.-Ing. degree from Ruhr University Bochum , Germany, in 2001.

He is presently Alexander von Humboldt Professor for Artificial Intelligence, Chair of Nature Inspired Computing and Engineering , Faculty of Technology, Bielefeld University, Germany, and Distinguished Chair in Computational Intelligence, Department of Computer Science, University of Surrey, United Kingdom. He was a "Finland Distinguished Professor" with the University of Jyvaskyla, Finland, and "Changjiang Distinguished Visiting Professor" with the Northeastern University, China. He was also a distinguished visiting scholar at the University of Science and Technology Sydney.

He was named Fellow of the Institute of Electrical and Electronics Engineers (IEEE) in 2015 (class 2016) "for contributions to evolutionary optimization", and was selected a Member of Academia Europaea in 2021. He won the 2025 IEEE Frank Rosenblatt Award.

He is presently the Editor-in-Chief of the IEEE Transactions on Cognitive and Developmental Systems, and the Editor-in-Chief of Complex & Intelligent Systems.

Prof Jin was named a Highly Cited Researcher from 2019 and 2024 by Clarivate's Web of Science group.
