= Marja Timmermans =

Dutch plant geneticist

- Born: 1964 (age 61–62)
- Education: Rutgers University; Yale University
- Scientific career
- Fields: Plant genetics
- Workplaces: Cold Spring Harbor Laboratory; University of Tübingen

Marja C. P. Timmermans (born 1964) is a Dutch plant geneticist. Her research focuses on how leaves in plants develop on a molecular biological level.

Timmermans studied biology at Rutgers University and Yale University. From 1998 she was affiliated with the Cold Spring Harbor Laboratory, where she became an assistant professor in 2001 and a full professor in 2009. In 2015 she received a Humboldt Professorship and moved to the University of Tübingen.

In 2020 she was elected as a member of the German Academy of Sciences Leopoldina.
