= Stathis =

Stathis is a Greek masculine given name and diminutive of Eustathios, in English rendered Eustace.
It may refer to:

- Stathis Giallelis (born 21 January 1941) Greek actor
- Stathis Psaltis (1948–2017), Greek actor
- Stathis K. Zachos (Στάθης (Ευστάθιος) Ζάχος born 1947, Athens) mathematician, logician and theoretical computer scientist
- Stathis Chaitas (Στάθης Xάιτας born 20 March 1940) football midfielder during the 1960s and 1970s
- Stathis Damianakos (Στάθης Δαμιανάκος 1939 – 2003) researcher in the fields of agriculture
- Stathis Karamalikis (born 4 December 1981 in Zakynthos, Greece) professional football striker
- Giannis Stathis (born 20 May 1987) Greek professional footballer
- Efstathios Tavlaridis, commonly known as Stathis Tavlaridis, Greek football defender
- Stathis Kappos (born 1979), Greek-Canadian soccer player
- Stathis Provatidis (Στάθης Προβατίδης; born 2 December 1982), Greek footballer playing for Diagoras F.C.
- Stathis Kalyvas (Greek: Στάθης Ν. Καλύβας, born 7 March 1964) Greek political scientist, author of The Logic of Violence in Civil War

== In fiction ==
- Stathis Borans, character from the 1986 film The Fly
