= The Bottom Billion =

2007 book by Paul Collier

- Hardcover book cover for The Bottom Billion
- Author: Paul Collier
- Language: English
- Subject: Economics, poverty
- Genre: Non-fiction
- Publisher: Oxford University Press
- Publication date: April 15, 2007
- Publication place: United Kingdom
- ISBN: 978-0195311457
- OCLC: 76073943
- Dewey Decimal: 338.9009172/4 22
- LC Class: HC79.P6 C634 2007

The Bottom Billion: Why the Poorest Countries are Failing and What Can Be Done About It is a 2007 book by Paul Collier, Professor of Economics at Oxford University, exploring the reasons why impoverished countries fail to progress despite international aid and support. In the book Collier argues that there are many countries whose residents have experienced little, if any, income growth over the 1980s and 1990s. On his reckoning, there are just under 60 such economies, home to almost 1 billion people.

== Synopsis ==
=== Development traps ===
The book suggests that, whereas the majority of the 5 billion people in the "developing world" are getting richer at an unprecedented rate, a group of countries (mostly in Africa and Central Asia but with a smattering elsewhere) are stuck and that development assistance should be focused heavily on them. These countries typically suffer from one or more development traps.

The Conflict Trap: Civil wars (with an estimated average cost of $64bn each) and coups incur large economic costs to a country. Additionally, in the time period immediately following a major conflict, relapse is highly likely. Collier also argues that the longer a country stays in a state of conflict, the more players become established that profit from the state of tumult, making the situation increasingly intractable.

The Natural Resource Trap: Countries that are rich in natural resources are paradoxically usually worse off than countries that are not. Collier attributes this to a variety of causes:

- Resources make conflict for the resources nearly inevitable due to the lack of transparency provided by government officials who often use surpluses of natural resources for their own benefit
- Natural resources mean that a government does not have to tax its citizens. Consequently, the citizenry are less likely to demand financial accountability from the government.
- The exploitation of valuable natural resources can result in Dutch disease, where a country's other industries become less competitive as a result of currency valuation due to the revenue raised from the resource.

Landlocked with Bad Neighbours: Poor landlocked countries with poor neighbours find it almost impossible to tap into world economic growth. Collier explains that countries with coastline trade with the world, while landlocked countries only trade with their neighbors. Landlocked countries with poor infrastructure connections to their neighbors therefore necessarily have a limited market for their goods.

Bad Governance in a Small Country: Terrible governance and policies can destroy an economy with alarming speed. The reason small countries are at a disadvantage is that though they may have a low cost-of-living, and therefore be ideal for labor-intensive work, their smallness discourages potential investors, who are unfamiliar with the local conditions and risks, who instead opt for better known countries like China and India.

=== Solutions ===
He suggests a number of relatively inexpensive but institutionally difficult changes:

1. Aid agencies should increasingly be concentrated in the most difficult environments, accept more risk. Ordinary citizens should not support poorly informed vociferous lobbies whose efforts are counterproductive and severely constrain what the Aid agencies can do.
2. Appropriate Military Interventions (such as the British in Sierra Leone) should be encouraged, especially to guarantee democratic governments against coups.
3. International Charters are needed to encourage good governance and provide prototypes.
4. Trade Policy needs to encourage free trade and give preferential access to Bottom Billion exports.

=== Bottom billion countries ===
The book does not include a list of bottom billion countries because Collier believes this might lead to a "self-fulfilling prophecy". However, he states that there are 58 such countries mentioned throughout the book. In his book Wars, Guns, and Votes, Collier lists the Bottom Billion, to "focus international effort": Afghanistan, Angola, Azerbaijan, Benin, Bhutan, Bolivia, Burkina Faso, Burundi, Cambodia, Cameroon, Central African Republic, Chad, Comoros, Democratic Republic of the Congo, Republic of the Congo, Ivory Coast, Djibouti, Equatorial Guinea, Eritrea, Ethiopia, Gambia, Ghana, Guinea, Guinea-Bissau, Guyana, Haiti, Kazakhstan, Kenya, North Korea, Kyrgyzstan, Laos, Lesotho, Liberia, Madagascar, Malawi, Mali, Mauritania, Moldova, Mongolia, Mozambique, Myanmar, Nepal, Niger, Nigeria, Rwanda, Senegal, Sierra Leone, Somalia, Sudan, Tajikistan, Tanzania, Togo, Turkmenistan, Uganda, Uzbekistan, Yemen, Zambia, and Zimbabwe.

== Reception ==
Martin Wolf in the Financial Times called it "a splendid book" and "particularly enjoyed the attack on the misguided economics of many non-governmental organisations." He says that Collier sheds much light on how the world should tackle its biggest moral challenge. It shows, too, how far western governments and other external actors are from currently giving the sort of help these countries desperately need. The Guardian called it an important book and suggested that citizens of G8 countries should fight for change along the lines he suggests. The Economist said it was "set to become a classic" and "should be compulsory reading for anyone embroiled in the hitherto thankless business of trying to pull people out of the pit of poverty where the "bottom billion" of the world's population of 6.6 billion seem irredeemably stuck". Nicolas Kristof in the New York Times described it as "'The best book on international affairs so far this year".

William Easterly, an influential American economist specialising in economic growth and foreign aid, critically assessed The Bottom Billion in The Lancet. He lambasts it for being an "ivory tower analysis of real world poverty". Easterly notes that much of Collier's advice is constructive, but he is concerned that it is advice based on shaky argument, argument which relies on statistical correlation to establish causation. For example, Collier makes much of the "conflict trap" and clearly poverty and civil war do occur together, but this may be, according to Easterly, "[perhaps] only because they are both symptoms of deeper problems, like Africa's weak states, ethnic antagonisms, and the legacy of the slave trade and colonial exploitation." Collier counters, "At present the clarion call for the right is economist William Easterly's book The White Man's Burden. Easterly is right to mock the delusions of the aid lobby. But just as [Jeffrey] Sachs exaggerates the payoff to aid, Easterly exaggerates the downside and again neglects the scope for other policies. We are not as impotent and ignorant as Easterly seems to think."
