= Exodus: How Migration Is Changing Our World =

Book by Paul Collier

- Cover of the first edition
- Author: Paul Collier
- Language: English
- Subjects: Immigration, politics
- Publisher: Oxford University Press
- Publication date: October 1, 2013
- Publication place: United Kingdom
- Media type: Print (Hardcover and Paperback)
- Pages: 309
- ISBN: 978-0195398656

Exodus: How Migration is Changing Our World (titled Exodus: Immigration and Multiculturalism in the 21st Century for its UK release) is a 2013 book by the development economist Paul Collier about the way migration affects migrants as well as the countries that send and receive the migrants, and the implications this has for development economics and the quest to end poverty. It was published by Oxford University Press. Collier's book focuses on the challenges posed by the nexus of immigration and multiculturalism, and also claims that brain drain is one of the main, often overlooked, drawbacks of migration. According to Colin Kidd, Collier argues that Western immigration policy has been driven not by reason, but by emotional responses to postcolonial Western guilt "while stifling consideration of wider problems of global poverty."

== Reception ==
Writing for The Guardian, Colin Kidd called the book "a humane and sensible voice in a highly toxic debate." Ian Birrell also reviewed the book for The Guardian, writing: "Given the evidence, Paul Collier's lively study of mass migration paints a curiously bleak picture of the future." Rupert Edis reviewed the book for The Telegraph, calling it "[a] frank dissection of the costs and benefits of immigration." David Goodhart reviewed the book for The Sunday Times, calling it a "hard-headed book that assesses the effect of the brain drain from poor countries to richer ones." Melanie McDonagh reviewed the book for The Spectator.

Robert Putnam, Malkin Professor of Public Policy, Harvard University reviewed the book saying: "Magisterial. Paul Collier offers a comprehensive, incisive, and well-written balance sheet of the pros and cons of immigration for receiving societies, sending societies, and migrants themselves. For everyone on every side of this contentious issue, Exodus is a must-read."

Robert Zoellick, former President of the World Bank Group, U.S. Trade Representative, and U.S. Deputy Secretary of State, praised the book as a "true achievement" and wrote that Collier addressed "taboo topics to straightforward questions that most other scholars shrink from asking."

Ravi Mattu reviewed the book for Financial Times, concluding by writing: "Prof Collier's is a voice to which it is worth paying attention. His book could be better written but this grandson of an immigrant is asking important questions about one of the world's most pressing issues." A review of the book was also published in The Economist, concluding with the statement: "the tone of “Exodus” is problematic. Mr Collier finds endless objections to a policy—more or less unlimited immigration—that no country has adopted. In the process, he exaggerates the possible risks of mobility and underplays its proven benefits."

British commentator Kenan Malik reviewed the book in The Independent.

Michael Clemens and Justin Sandefur of the Center for Global Development (a Washington D.C.–based think tank) reviewed the book for the January/February 2014 issue of Foreign Affairs. They noted that many of Collier's conclusions were unsupported by research, and concluded as follows: "Collier laments the fact that the immigration debate has been marked by “high emotion and little knowledge.” That is true, yet Exodus exemplifies the problem. This book could have seriously engaged with the large literature on immigration and helped people without Collier's training and position think through the complexities of the issue. Instead, Collier has written a text mortally wounded by incoherence, error, and overconfident leaps to baseless conclusions."
