= Military aid =

Aid for the armed forces of a country

Military aid is aid which is used to assist a country or its people in its defense efforts, or to assist a poor country in maintaining control over its own territory. Many countries receive military aid to help with counter-insurgency efforts. Military aid can be given to a rebellion to help fight another country. This aid may be given in the form of money for foreign militaries to buy weapons and equipment from the donor country.

In the 21st century, increasing numbers of scholars are identifying how military assistance is an instrument of power projection for influence in the era of great power competition. Various strong states are avoiding direct conflict and are engaging in the low-risk mission of train, advise, and assist (TAA) and equipping a military/militia partner/ally to pursue certain objectives and national interests.

== Design and Implementation ==
The design and implementation of military aid is highly contextual based on the circumstances which are targeted. Military aid is often bundled with development aid as a part of broader strategic aid-goals. While development aid seeks to change conditions by supporting nascent institutions, education, or growth, military aid focuses on the demand for physical security. For example, AFRICOM, the US’s regional military command in Africa seeks to fulfill security objectives such as stability and counter-terrorism but also democracy and economic growth. To that end, AFRICOM provides military aid in the forms of drone support and equipment for local armed forces, but also development aid targeted at increasing community education and increases local wages. Similar initiatives are implemented by UN to incorporate military assistance and development aid in their peacekeeping programs, with the end of “support[ing] the restoration and enhancement of essential services…and help to tackle the root causes of conflict.”

Military aid is often used in cases where development aid or other forms of cash-flows prove inadequate. High poverty situations may preclude the possibility of raising the standard of living through the transfer of money, because recipient nations lack the infrastructure and political action needed to convert the aid into welfare. Poor nations are often stuck in a ‘conflict trap’ of civil war, looting, patronage, and coups. In insecure environments money may be siphoned off for corruption, looting, captured by local warlords, or be simply ineffective. For example, humanitarian aid after the Rwandan conflict was captured by Hutu genocidaires and used to continue their insurgency. In these situations, military aid is useful in creating an environment where aid can be transported and dispersed effectively.

Military aid in conjunction with development aid is argued to have greater power to create stability than either of them alone. This because a two sided approach allows aid agencies to use a wider range or tools to nudge local actors into maintaining peace. The World Bank writes that combined action could decrease the probability of civil war onset by 50%.

== Drawbacks ==
Military aid is the subject of controversy surrounding aid directed at repressive or transitioning states, where its effectiveness is not so clear. Military aid is often mistaken as arms sales, though the two are quite they are actually different. When targeted improperly, military aid can fuel repression or instability by giving warring parties more resources to fight with or propping up illiberal governments. Shipments of arms, air support, or training can make a sitting government more able to suppress dissent. More specifically, military aid has been linked to the rise in extrajudicial killings. Governments that receive large levels of external sponsorship may be empowered to crack down on a dissident civilian population, and lose incentive for reform. Dube and Naidu analyse the effect of military aid on Colombia during the war on drugs, and write that "Aid...results in more paramilitary homicides.... foreign military assistance may strengthen armed non-state actors, undermining domestic political institutions." Dube and Naidu conclude that the overall effect of military aid is to increase the state strength of the recipient, but that this may also include empowering state-linked paramilitary operations. While state strength may be in line with the donor's foreign policy objectives, empowering paramilitary groups may increase human rights violations. Groups in Colombia are armed and sponsored by the government, but lack the same checks and punishments for misbehavior that are present in government forces. As a result, paramilitary groups have significantly higher documented rates of human rights abuses including torture and extrajudicial killings.

There are arguments also offered that consider military assistance to be effective, but only when substantial resources are dedicated to the endeavor. However, there are equally persuasive arguments (offered by one military officer) that substantial amounts of military assistance in weak states (such as Afghanistan, Iraq, Somalia, etc.) only leads to the creation of Fabergé Egg armies: expensive to create but easily "cracked" by insurgents. In either case, there is substantial domestic and international politics involved in the provision of aid and training when it comes to trying to build foreign security forces.

== See also ==
- United States military aid
- United States security assistance to the Palestinian National Authority
- Military budget
- Lend-Lease
