= Conflict trap =

Concept in conflict studies

Conflict trap is a term to describe the pattern when civil wars repeat themselves.

== Description ==
Scholars have offered a few reasons for it, after Paul Collier and Nicholas Sambanis (2002) noticed a pattern and coined the term 'conflict trap'. Firstly, a civil war can aggravate the causal political and economic conditions which lead to a repeat civil war. Other reasons can be because the combatants are fighting over stakes that are valuable to both parties, combatants are unable to defeat each other or are engaged in a serious war of long duration.

Political and legal institutions play an important role in inhibiting repeat civil wars, and thus preventing a country from entering a conflict trap. Strong institutions can put checks on the incumbent's power, hence ensuring public welfare, which means rebels have fewer reasons to restart a civil war, and which removes the need for the rebels to maintain an army or a threat of war. Strong political and legal systems also give a non-violent platform to rebels to bring about desired changes, so they may not feel a need to adopt violent ways of protest.

There can be other reasons why a civil war may start and repeat itself. There may be intense grievances held by the groups, which motivate them to fight. Inferior health conditions, lower GDP, and poor human development create conditions for dissatisfaction, and hence civil wars. If a country is poor, it may be easier for rebels to organize an army to start a civil war. Weaker states provide an easier path for rebellion, since they lack sufficient capacity to effectively keep rebels in check. A country's geography may also contribute in wars, since rebels can easily escape and evade detection.

Where a population holds significant grievances, governments can be reluctant to make concessions to violent groups if they were previously unwilling to submit to nonviolent pressure. If they are willing to make concessions, a resolution could be prevented due to commitment problems.

== See also ==
- The Bottom Billion
- Vicious cycle
- Israeli–Palestinian conflict
