= Civil war =

War within a country

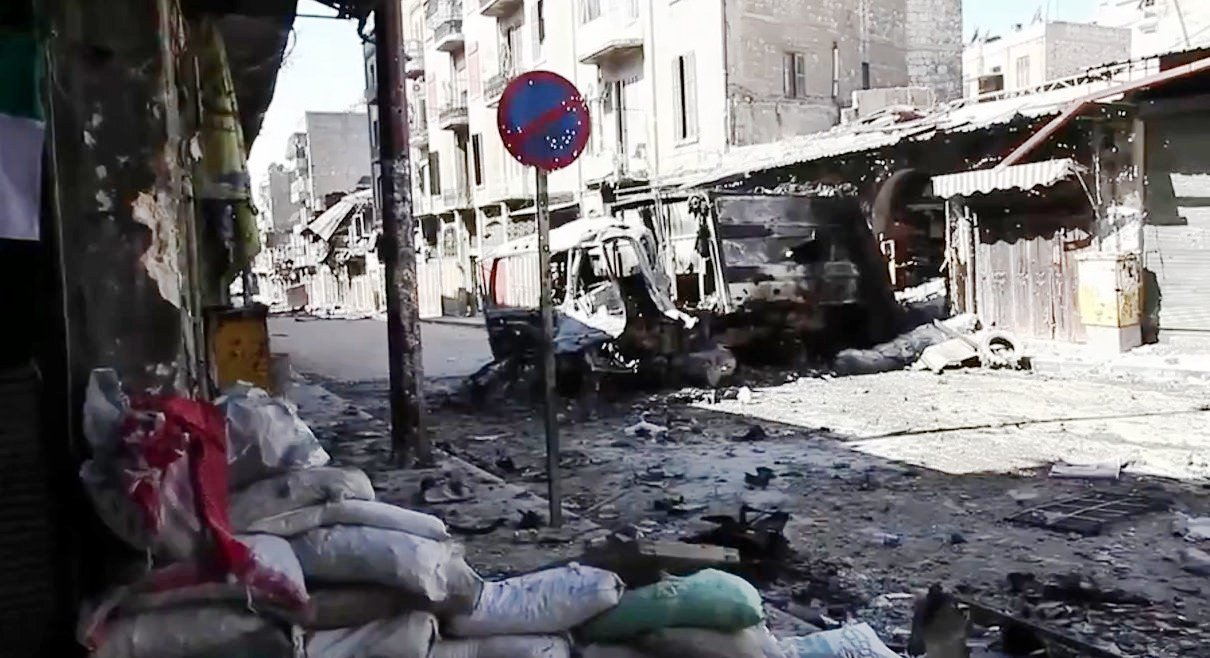
Scene of the Battle of Aleppo in 2012 during the Syrian civil war

A civil war (Note: Legally known as non-international armed conflict (NIAC) and also known as an intrastate war in war studies) is a war between organized groups within the same state (or country). The aim of one side may be to take control of the country or a region, to achieve independence for a region, or to change government policies. The term is a calque of Latin bellum civile which was used to refer to the various civil wars of the Roman Republic in the 1st century BC. Civil here means "of/related to citizens", a civil war being a war between the citizenry, rather than with an outsider.

Most modern civil wars involve intervention by outside powers. According to Patrick M. Regan in his book Civil Wars and Foreign Powers (2000) about two thirds of the 138 intrastate conflicts between the end of World War II and 2000 saw international intervention.

A civil war is often a high-intensity conflict, often involving regular armed forces, that is sustained, organized and large-scale. Civil wars may result in large numbers of casualties and the consumption of significant resources.

Civil wars since the end of World War II have lasted on average just over four years, a dramatic rise from the one-and-a-half-year average of the 1900–1944 period. While the rate of emergence of new civil wars has been relatively steady since the mid-19th century, the increasing length of those wars has resulted in increasing numbers of wars ongoing at any one time. For example, there were no more than five civil wars underway simultaneously in the first half of the 20th century while there were over 20 concurrent civil wars close to the end of the Cold War. Since 1945, civil wars have resulted in the deaths of over 25 million people, as well as the forced displacement of millions more. Civil wars have further resulted in economic collapse; Somalia, Burma (Myanmar), Uganda and Angola are examples of nations that were considered to have had promising futures before being engulfed in civil wars.

== Classification ==
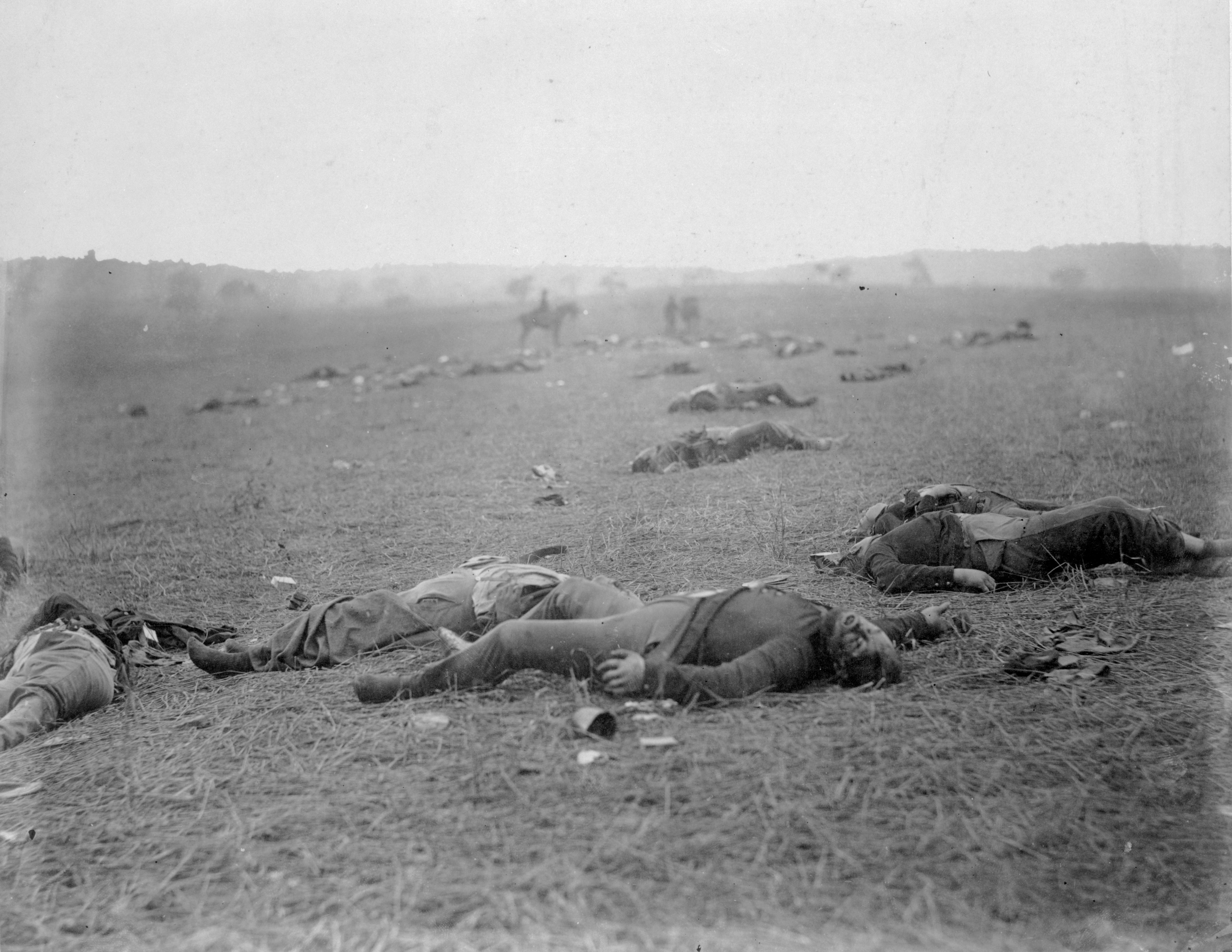
Aftermath of the Battle of Gettysburg, American Civil War, 1863

James Fearon, a scholar of civil wars at Stanford University, defines a civil war as "a violent conflict within a country fought by organized groups that aim to take power at the center or in a region, or to change government policies". Ann Hironaka further specifies that one side of a civil war is the state. Stathis Kalyvas defines civil war as "armed combat taking place within the boundaries of a recognized sovereign entity between parties that are subject to a common authority at the outset of the hostilities." The intensity at which a civil disturbance becomes a civil war is contested by academics. Some political scientists define a civil war as having more than 1,000 casualties, while others further specify that at least 100 must come from each side. The Correlates of War, a dataset widely used by scholars of conflict, classifies civil wars as having over 1,000 war-related casualties per year of conflict. This rate is a small fraction of the millions killed in the Second Sudanese Civil War and Cambodian Civil War, for example, but excludes several highly publicized conflicts, such as The Troubles of Northern Ireland and the struggle of the African National Congress in Apartheid-era South Africa.

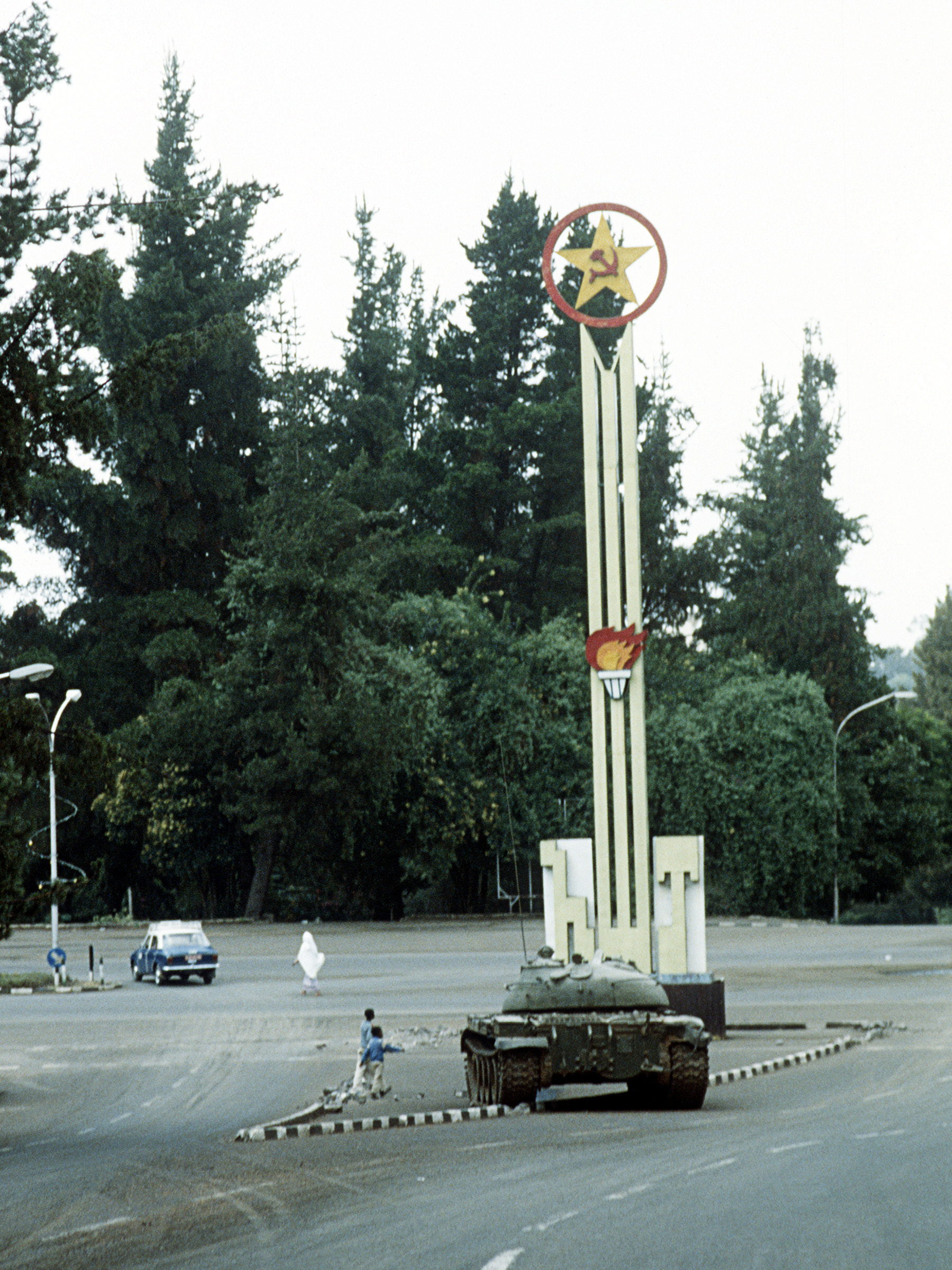
Tanks in the streets of Addis Ababa after rebels seized the capital during the Ethiopian Civil War (1991)

Based on the 1,000-casualties-per-year criterion, there were 213 civil wars from 1816 to 1997, 104 of which occurred from 1944 to 1997. If one uses the less-stringent 1,000 casualties total criterion, there were over 90 civil wars between 1945 and 2007, with 20 ongoing civil wars as of 2007.

The Geneva Conventions do not specifically define the term "civil war"; nevertheless, they do outline the responsibilities of parties in "armed conflict not of an international character". This includes civil wars; however, no specific definition of civil war is provided in the text of the Conventions.

Nevertheless, the International Committee of the Red Cross has sought to provide some clarification through its commentaries on the Geneva Conventions, noting that the Conventions are "so general, so vague, that many of the delegations feared that it might be taken to cover any act committed by force of arms". Accordingly, the commentaries provide for different 'conditions' on which the application of the Geneva Convention would depend; the commentary, however, points out that these should not be interpreted as rigid conditions. The conditions listed by the ICRC in its commentary are as follows:

1. That the Party in revolt against the de jure Government possesses an organized military force, an authority responsible for its acts, acting within a determinate territory and having the means of respecting and ensuring respect for the convention.
2. That the legal Government is obliged to have recourse to the regular military forces against insurgents organized as military and in possession of a part of the national territory.
3. (a) That the de jure Government has recognized the insurgents as belligerents;
  (b) That it has claimed for itself the rights of a belligerent; or
  (c) That it has accorded the insurgents recognition as belligerents for the purposes only of the present Convention; or
  (d) That the dispute has been admitted to the agenda of the Security Council or the General Assembly of the United Nations as being a threat to international peace, a breach of the peace, or an act of aggression.
4. (a) That the insurgents have an organization purporting to have the characteristics of a State.
  (b) That the insurgent civil authority exercises de facto authority over the population within a determinate portion of the national territory.
  (c) That the armed forces act under the direction of an organized authority and are prepared to observe the ordinary laws of war.
  (d) That the insurgent civil authority agrees to be bound by the provisions of the convention.

== Causes ==
According to a 2017 review study of civil war research, there are three prominent explanations for civil war: greed-based explanations which center on individuals' desire to maximize their profits, grievance-based explanations which center on conflict as a response to socioeconomic or political injustice, and opportunity-based explanations which center on factors that make it easier to engage in violent mobilization. According to the study, the most influential explanation for civil war onset is the opportunity-based explanation by James Fearon and David Laitin in their 2003 American Political Science Review article.

=== Greed ===
Scholars investigating the cause of civil war are attracted by two opposing theories, greed versus grievance. Roughly stated: are conflicts caused by differences of ethnicity, religion or other social affiliation, or do conflicts begin because it is in the economic best interests of individuals and groups to start them? Scholarly analysis supports the conclusion that economic and structural factors are more important than those of identity in predicting occurrences of civil war.

A comprehensive study of civil war was carried out by a team from the World Bank in the early 21st century. The study framework, which came to be called the Collier–Hoeffler Model, examined 78 five-year increments when civil war occurred from 1960 to 1999, as well as 1,167 five-year increments of "no civil war" for comparison, and subjected the data set to regression analysis to see the effect of various factors. The factors that were shown to have a statistically significant effect on the chance that a civil war would occur in any given five-year period were:

A high proportion of primary commodities in national exports significantly increases the risk of a conflict. A country at "peak danger", with commodities comprising 32% of gross domestic product, has a 22% risk of falling into civil war in a given five-year period, while a country with no primary commodity exports has a 1% risk. When disaggregated, only petroleum and non-petroleum groupings showed different results: a country with relatively low levels of dependence on petroleum exports is at slightly less risk, while a high level of dependence on oil as an export results in slightly more risk of a civil war than national dependence on another primary commodity. The authors of the study interpreted this as being the result of the ease by which primary commodities may be extorted or captured compared to other forms of wealth; for example, it is easy to capture and control the output of a gold mine or oil field compared to a sector of garment manufacturing or hospitality services.

A second source of finance is national diasporas, which can fund rebellions and insurgencies from abroad. The study found that statistically switching the size of a country's diaspora from the smallest found in the study to the largest resulted in a sixfold increase in the chance of a civil war.

Higher male secondary school enrollment, per capita income and economic growth rate all had significant effects on reducing the chance of civil war. Specifically, a male secondary school enrollment 10% above the average reduced the chance of a conflict by about 3%, while a growth rate 1% higher than the study average resulted in a decline in the chance of a civil war of about 1%. The study interpreted these three factors as proxies for earnings forgone by rebellion, and therefore that lower forgone earnings encourage rebellion. Phrased another way: young males (who make up the vast majority of combatants in civil wars) are less likely to join a rebellion if they are getting an education or have a comfortable salary, and can reasonably assume that they will prosper in the future.

Low per capita income has also been proposed as a cause for grievance, prompting armed rebellion. However, for this to be true, one would expect economic inequality to also be a significant factor in rebellions, which it is not. The study therefore concluded that the economic model of opportunity cost better explained the findings.

=== Grievance ===
Most proxies for "grievance"—the theory that civil wars begin because of issues of identity, rather than economics—were statistically insignificant, including economic equality, political rights, ethnic polarization and religious fractionalization. Only ethnic dominance, the case where the largest ethnic group comprises a majority of the population, increased the risk of civil war. A country characterized by ethnic dominance has nearly twice the chance of a civil war. However, the combined effects of ethnic and religious fractionalization, i.e. the greater chance that any two randomly chosen people will be from separate ethnic or religious groups, the less chance of a civil war, were also significant and positive, as long as the country avoided ethnic dominance. The study interpreted this as stating that minority groups are more likely to rebel if they feel that they are being dominated, but that rebellions are more likely to occur the more homogeneous the population and thus more cohesive the rebels. These two factors may thus be seen as mitigating each other in many cases.

=== Criticism of the "greed versus grievance" theory ===
David Keen, a professor at the Development Studies Institute at the London School of Economics is one of the major critics of greed vs. grievance theory, defined primarily by Paul Collier, and argues the point that a conflict, although he cannot define it, cannot be pinpointed to simply one motive. He believes that conflicts are much more complex and thus should not be analyzed through simplified methods. He disagrees with the quantitative research methods of Collier and believes a stronger emphasis should be put on personal data and human perspective of the people in conflict.

Beyond Keen, several other authors have introduced works that either disprove greed vs. grievance theory with empirical data, or dismiss its ultimate conclusion. Authors such as Cristina Bodea and Ibrahim Elbadawi, who co-wrote the entry, "Riots, coups and civil war: Revisiting the greed and grievance debate", argue that empirical data can disprove many of the proponents of greed theory and make the idea "irrelevant". They examine a myriad of factors and conclude that too many factors come into play with conflict, which cannot be confined to simply greed or grievance.

Anthony Vinci makes a strong argument that "fungible concept of power and the primary motivation of survival provide superior explanations of armed group motivation and, more broadly, the conduct of internal conflicts".

=== Opportunities ===
James Fearon and David Laitin find that ethnic and religious diversity does not make civil war more likely. They instead find that factors that make it easier for rebels to recruit foot soldiers and sustain insurgencies, such as "poverty—which marks financially & bureaucratically weak states and also favors rebel recruitment—political instability, rough terrain, and large populations" make civil wars more likely.

Such research finds that civil wars happen because the state is weak; both authoritarian and democratic states can be stable if they have the financial and military capacity to put down rebellions.

==== Critical responses to Fearon and Laitin ====
Some scholars, such as Lars-Erik Cederman of the Center for Security Studies (CSS) at the Swiss Federal Institute of Technology, have criticized the data used by Fearon and Laitin to determine ethnic and religious diversity. In his 2007 paper Beyond Fractionalization: Mapping Ethnicity onto Nationalist Insurgencies, Cederman argues that the ethno-linguistic fractionalization index (ELF) used by Fearon, Laitin and other political scientists is flawed. E.L.F. Cederman states, measures diversity on a country's population-wide level and makes no attempt to determine the number of ethnic groups in relation to what role they play in the power of the state and its military. Cederman believes it makes little sense to test hypotheses relating national ethnic diversity to civil war outbreak without any explicit reference to how many different ethnic groups actually hold power in the state. This suggests that ethnic, linguistic and religious cleavages can matter, depending on the extent to which the various groups have ability and influence to mobilize on either side of a forming conflict. Themes explored in Cederman's later work criticizing the use of ethnic fractionalization measures as input variables to predict civil war outbreak relate to these indices not accounting for the geographical distribution of ethnic groups within countries, as this can affect their access to regional resources and commodities, which in turn can lead to conflict. A third theme explored by Cederman is that ethnolinguistic fractionalization does not quantify the extent to which there is pre-existing economic inequality between ethnic groups within countries. In a 2011 article, Cederman and fellow researchers describe finding that "in highly unequal societies, both rich and poor groups fight more often than those groups whose wealth lies closer to the country average", going against the opportunity-based explanation for civil war outbreak.

Michael Bleaney, Professor of International Economics at the University of Nottingham, published a 2009 paper titled Incidence, Onset and Duration of Civil Wars: A Review of the Evidence, which tested numerous variables for their relationship to civil war outbreak with different datasets, including that utilized by Fearon and Laitin. Bleaney concluded that neither ethnoreligious diversity, as measured by fractionalization, nor another variable, ethnic polarization, defined as the extent to which individuals in a population are distributed across different ethnic groups, were "a sufficient measure of diversity as it affects the probability of conflict."

=== Other causes ===
==== Bargaining problems ====
In a state torn by civil war, the contesting powers often do not have the ability to commit or the trust to believe in the other side's commitment to put an end to war. When considering a peace agreement, the involved parties are aware of the high incentives to withdraw once one of them has taken an action that weakens their military, political or economical power. Commitment problems may deter a lasting peace agreement as the powers in question are aware that neither of them is able to commit to their end of the bargain in the future. States are often unable to escape conflict traps (recurring civil war conflicts) due to the lack of strong political and legal institutions that motivate bargaining, settle disputes, and enforce peace settlements. Electoral wipeouts can contribute to restart of conflicts.

==== Governance ====
Political scientist Barbara F. Walter suggests that most contemporary civil wars are actually repeats of earlier civil wars that often arise when leaders are not accountable to the public, when there is poor public participation in politics, and when there is a lack of transparency of information between the executives and the public. Walter argues that when these issues are properly reversed, they act as political and legal restraints on executive power forcing the established government to better serve the people. Additionally, these political and legal restraints create a standardized avenue to influence government and increase the commitment credibility of established peace treaties. It is the strength of a nation's institutionalization and good governance—not the presence of democracy nor the poverty level—that is the number one indicator of the chance of a repeat civil war, according to Walter.

==== Military advantage ====
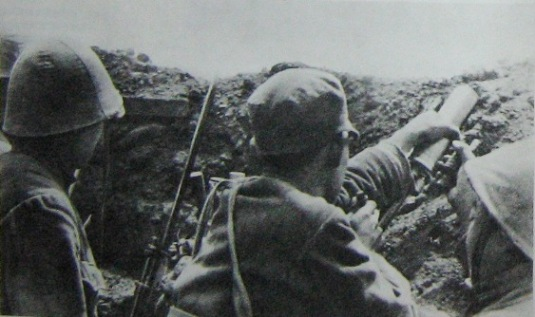
Communist soldiers during the Battle of Siping, Chinese Civil War, 1946

High levels of population dispersion and, to a lesser extent, the presence of mountainous terrain, increased the chance of conflict. Both of these factors favor rebels, as a population dispersed outward toward the borders is harder to control than one concentrated in a central region, while mountains offer terrain where rebels can seek sanctuary. Rough terrain was highlighted as one of the more important factors in a 2006 systematic review.

==== Population size ====
The various factors contributing to the risk of civil war rise increase with population size. The risk of a civil war rises approximately proportionately with the size of a country's population.

==== Poverty ====
There is a correlation between poverty and civil war, but the causality (which causes the other) is unclear. Some studies have found that in regions with lower income per capita, the likelihood of civil war is greater. Economists Simeon Djankov and Marta Reynal-Querol argue that the correlation is spurious, and that lower income and heightened conflict are instead products of other phenomena. In contrast, a study by Alex Braithwaite and colleagues showed systematic evidence of "a causal arrow running from poverty to conflict".

==== Inequality ====
While there is a supposed negative correlation between absolute welfare levels and the probability of civil war outbreak, relative deprivation may actually be a more pertinent possible cause. Historically, higher inequality levels led to higher civil war probability. Since colonial rule or population size are known to increase civil war risk, also, one may conclude that "the discontent of the colonized, caused by the creation of borders across tribal lines and bad treatment by the colonizers" is one important cause of civil conflicts.

==== Time ====
The more time that has elapsed since the last civil war, the less likely it is that a conflict will recur. The study had two possible explanations for this: one opportunity-based and the other grievance-based. The elapsed time may represent the depreciation of whatever capital the rebellion was fought over and thus increase the opportunity cost of restarting the conflict. Alternatively, elapsed time may represent the gradual process of healing of old hatreds. The study found that the presence of a diaspora substantially reduced the positive effect of time, as the funding from diasporas offsets the depreciation of rebellion-specific capital.

Evolutionary psychologist Satoshi Kanazawa has argued that an important cause of intergroup conflict may be the relative availability of women of reproductive age. He found that polygyny greatly increased the frequency of civil wars but not interstate wars. Gleditsch et al. did not find a relationship between ethnic groups with polygyny and increased frequency of civil wars but nations having legal polygamy may have more civil wars. They argued that misogyny is a better explanation than polygyny. They found that increased women's rights were associated with fewer civil wars and that legal polygamy had no effect after women's rights were controlled for.

Political scholar Elisabeth Wood from Yale University offers yet another rationale for why civilians rebel and/or support civil war. Through her studies of the Salvadoran Civil War, Wood finds that traditional explanations of greed and grievance are not sufficient to explain the emergence of that insurgent movement. Instead, she argues that "emotional engagements" and "moral commitments" are the main reasons why thousand of civilians, most of them from poor and rural backgrounds, joined or supported the Farabundo Martí National Liberation Front, despite individually facing both high risks and virtually no foreseeable gains. Wood also attributes participation in the civil war to the value that insurgents assigned to changing social relations in El Salvador, an experience she defines as the "pleasure of agency".

== Effects ==
Civil wars often have severe economic consequences: two studies estimate that each year of civil war reduces a country's GDP growth by about 2%. It also has a regional effect, reducing the GDP growth of neighboring countries. Civil wars also have the potential to lock the country in a conflict trap, where each conflict increases the likelihood of future conflict.

Deaths in intrastate conflicts based on where they occurred

Death rate in intrastate conflicts based on where they occurred

== Duration ==
Ann Hironaka, author of Neverending Wars, divides the modern history of civil wars into the pre-19th century, 19th century to early 20th century, and late 20th century. In 19th-century Europe, the length of civil wars fell significantly, largely due to the nature of the conflicts as battles for the power center of the state, the strength of centralized governments, and the normally quick and decisive intervention by other states to support the government. Following World War II the duration of civil wars grew past the norm of the pre-19th century, largely due to weakness of the many postcolonial states and the intervention by major powers on both sides of conflict. The most obvious commonality to civil wars are that they occur in fragile states.

=== In the 19th and early 20th centuries ===
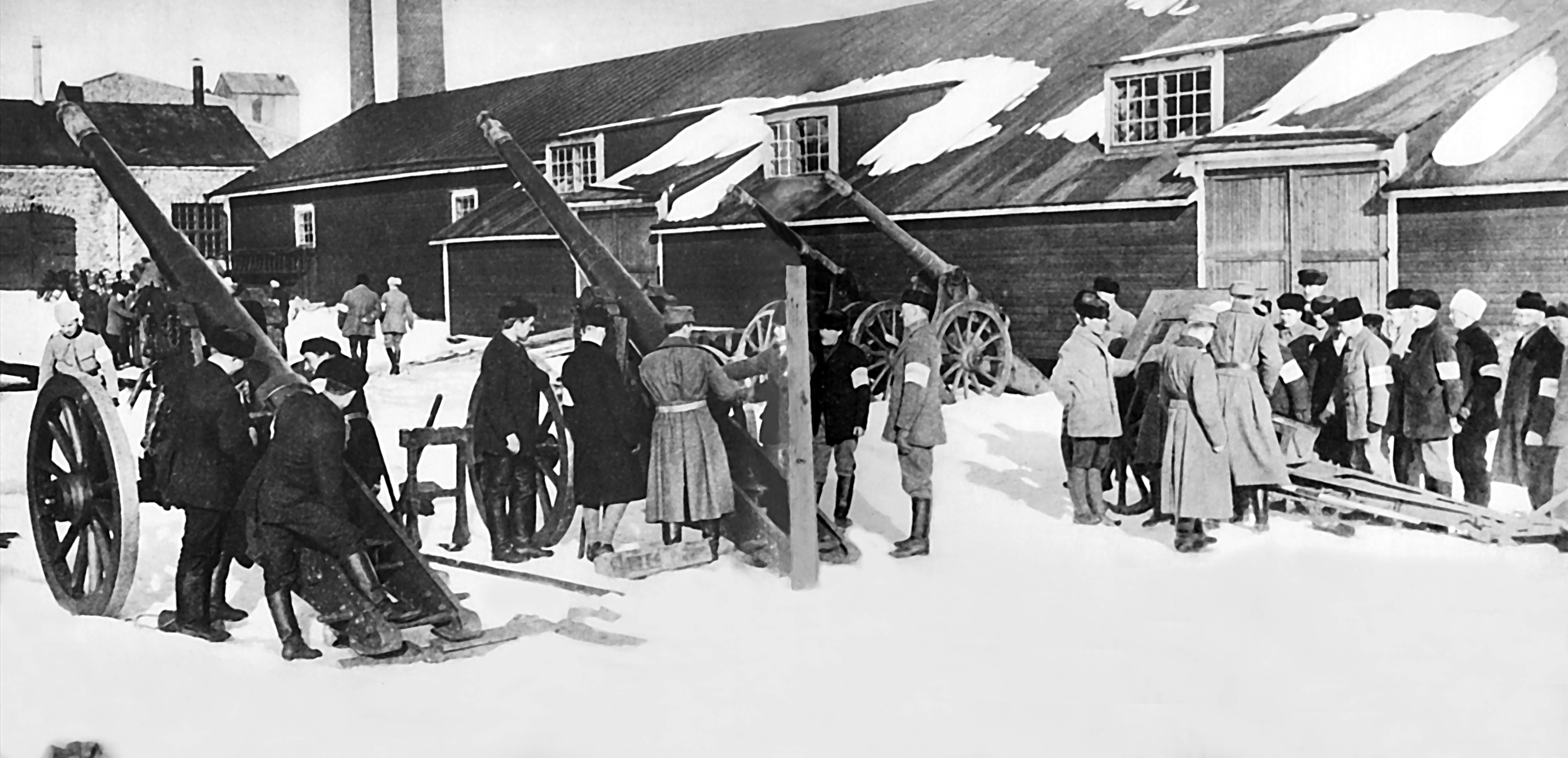
An artillery school set up by the anti-socialist "Whites" during the Finnish Civil War, 1918

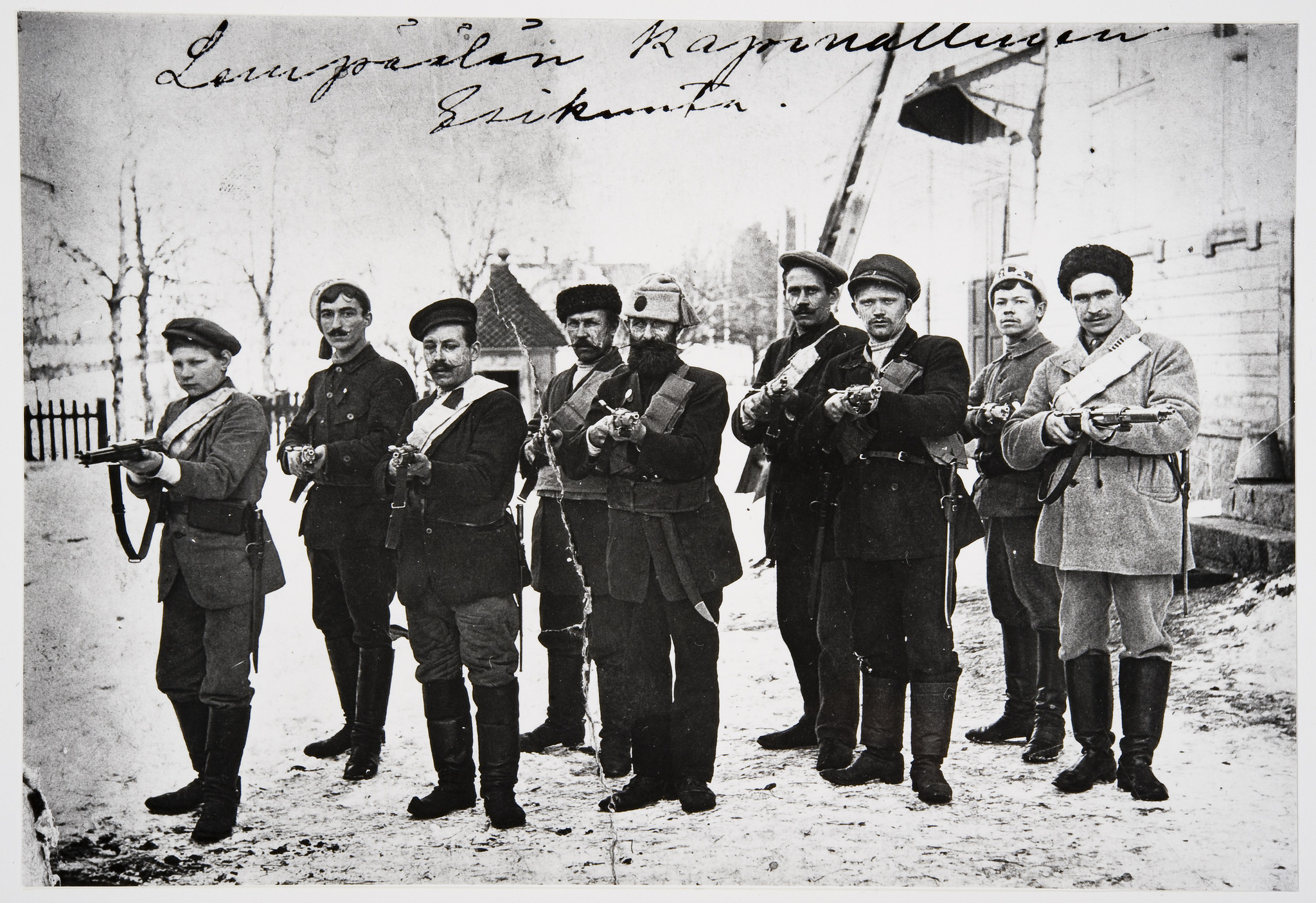
Members of the Red Guards during the Finnish Civil War of 1918

Civil wars in the 19th century and in the early 20th century tended to be short; civil wars between 1900 and 1944 lasted on average one and a half years. The state itself formed the obvious center of authority in the majority of cases, and the civil wars were thus fought for control of the state. This meant that whoever had control of the capital and the military could normally crush resistance. A rebellion which failed to quickly seize the capital and control of the military for itself normally found itself doomed to rapid destruction. For example, the fighting associated with the 1871 Paris Commune occurred almost entirely in Paris, and ended quickly once the military sided with the government at Versailles and conquered Paris.

The power of non-state actors resulted in a lower value placed on sovereignty in the 18th and 19th centuries, which further reduced the number of civil wars. For example, the pirates of the Barbary Coast were recognized as de facto states because of their military power. The Barbary pirates thus had no need to rebel against the Ottoman Empire—their nominal state government—to gain recognition of their sovereignty. Conversely, states such as Virginia and Massachusetts in the United States of America did not have sovereign status, but had significant political and economic independence coupled with weak federal control, reducing the incentive to secede.

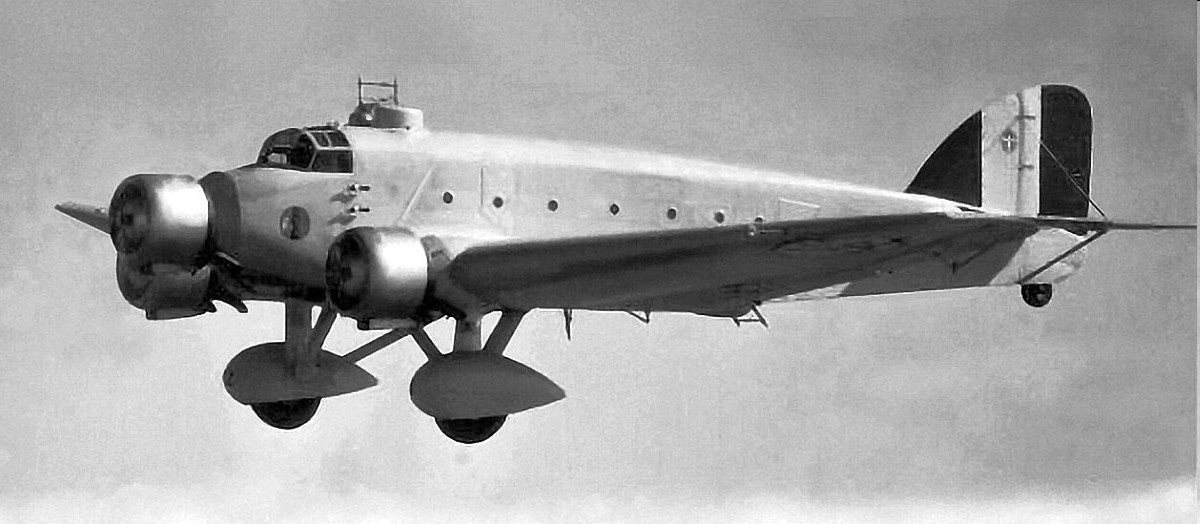
A plane, supported by smaller fighter planes, of Italian Legionary Air Force, allied to Francisco Franco's Nationalists, bombs Madrid during the Spanish Civil War (1936–1939)

The two major global ideologies, monarchism and democracy, led to several civil wars. However, a bi-polar world, divided between the two ideologies, did not develop, largely due to the dominance of monarchists through most of the period. The monarchists would thus normally intervene in other countries to stop democratic movements taking control and forming democratic governments, which were seen by monarchists as being both dangerous and unpredictable. The Great Powers (defined in the 1815 Congress of Vienna as the United Kingdom, Habsburg Austria, Prussia, France, and Russia) would frequently coordinate interventions in other nations' civil wars, nearly always on the side of the incumbent government. Given the military strength of the Great Powers, these interventions nearly always proved decisive and quickly ended the civil wars.

There were several exceptions from the general rule of quick civil wars during this period. The American Civil War (1861–1865) was unusual for at least two reasons: it was fought around regional identities as well as political ideologies, and it ended through a war of attrition, rather than with a decisive battle over control of the capital, as was the norm. The Spanish Civil War (1936–1939) proved exceptional because both sides in the struggle received support from intervening great powers: Germany, Italy, and Portugal supported opposition leader Francisco Franco, while France and the Soviet Union supported the government (see proxy war).

=== Since 1945 ===
Civil conflicts vs other conflicts 1946 to 2016

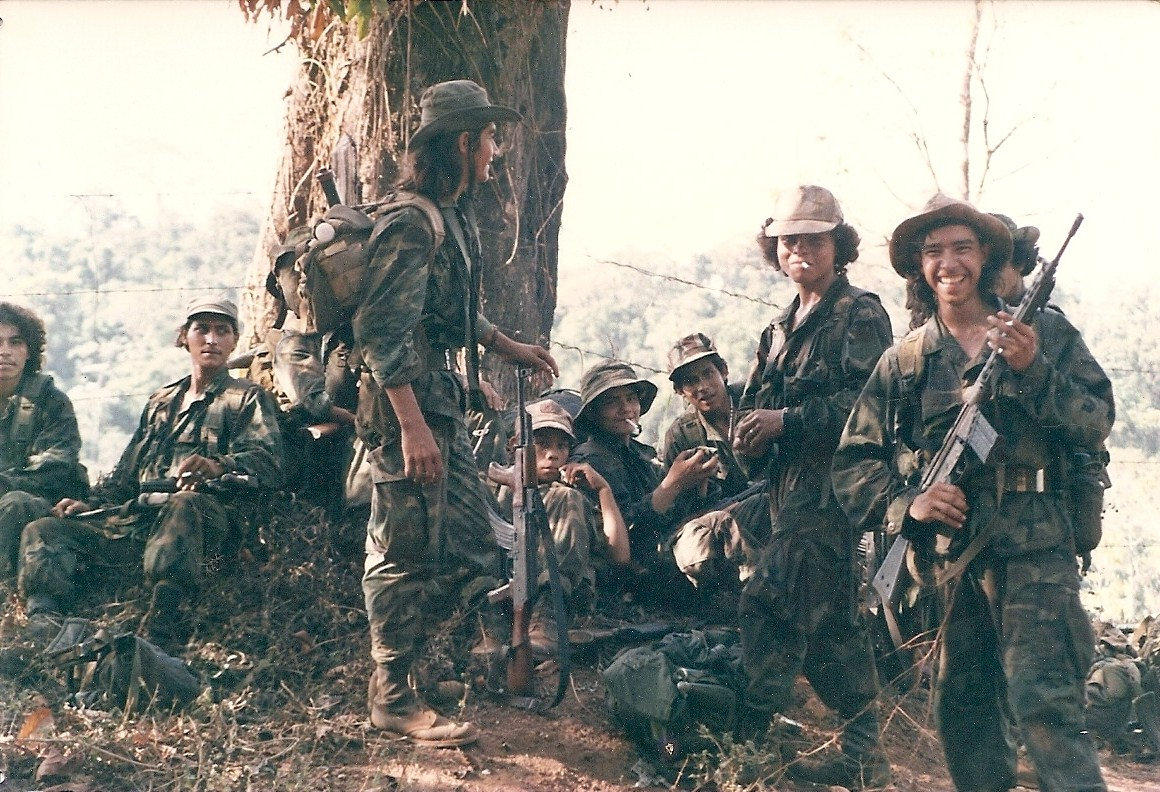
Members of ARDE Frente Sur during the Nicaraguan Revolution

In the 1990s, about twenty civil wars were occurring concurrently during an average year, a rate about ten times the historical average since the 19th century. However, the rate of new civil wars had not increased appreciably; the drastic rise in the number of ongoing wars after World War II was a result of the tripling of the average duration of civil wars to over four years. This increase was a result of the increased number of states, the fragility of states formed after 1945, the decline in interstate war, and the Cold War rivalry.

Following World War II, the major European powers divested themselves of their colonies at an increasing rate: the number of ex-colonial states jumped from about 30 to almost 120 after the war. The rate of state formation leveled off in the 1980s, at which point few colonies remained. More states also meant more states in which to have long civil wars. Hironaka statistically measures the impact of the increased number of ex-colonial states as increasing the post-World War II incidence of civil wars by +165% over the pre-1945 number.

While the new ex-colonial states appeared to follow the blueprint of the idealized state—centralized government, territory enclosed by defined borders, and citizenry with defined rights—as well as accessories such as a national flag, an anthem, a seat at the United Nations and an official economic policy, they were in actuality far weaker than the Western states they were modeled after. In Western states, the structure of governments closely matched states' actual capabilities, which had been arduously developed over centuries. The development of strong administrative structures, in particular those related to extraction of taxes, is closely associated with the intense warfare between predatory European states in the 17th and 18th centuries, or in Charles Tilly's famous formulation: "War made the state and the state made war". For example, the formation of the modern states of Germany and Italy in the 19th century is closely associated with the wars of expansion and consolidation led by Prussia and Sardinia-Piedmont, respectively. The Western process of forming effective and impersonal bureaucracies, developing efficient tax systems, and integrating national territory continued into the 20th century. Nevertheless, Western states that survived into the latter half of the 20th century were considered "strong" by simple reason that they had managed to develop the institutional structures and military capability required to survive predation by their fellow states.

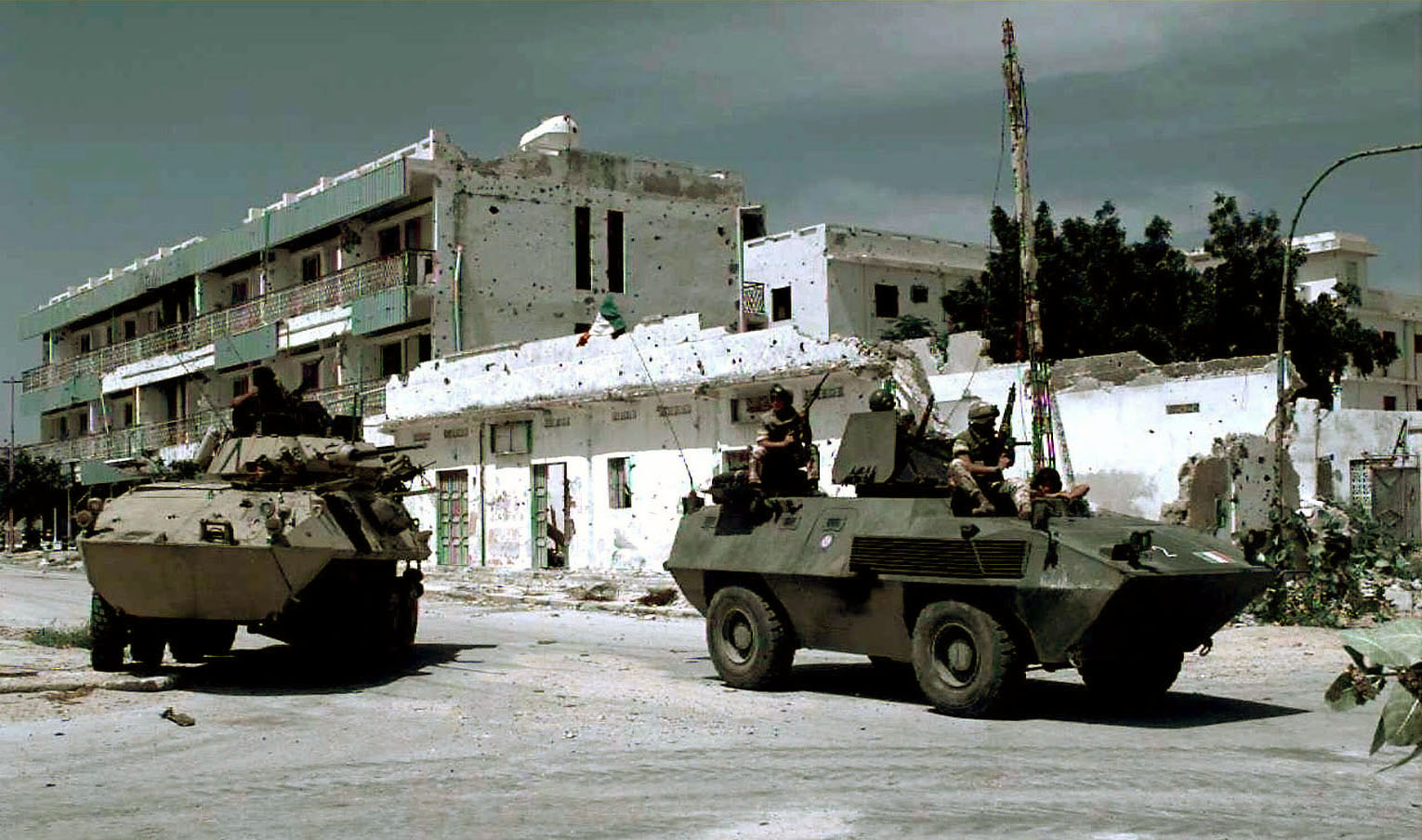
An American Cadillac Gage Light Armored Reconnaissance Vehicle and Italian Fiat-OTO Melara Type 6614 Armored Personnel Carrier guard an intersection during the Somali Civil War (1993).

In sharp contrast, decolonization was an entirely different process of state formation. Most imperial powers had not foreseen a need to prepare their colonies for independence; for example, Britain had given limited self-rule to India and Sri Lanka, while treating British Somaliland as little more than a trading post, while all major decisions for French colonies were made in Paris and Belgium prohibited any self-government up until it suddenly granted independence to its colonies in 1960. Like Western states of previous centuries, the new ex-colonies lacked autonomous bureaucracies, which would make decisions based on the benefit to society as a whole, rather than respond to corruption and nepotism to favor a particular interest group. In such a situation, factions manipulate the state to benefit themselves or, alternatively, state leaders use the bureaucracy to further their own self-interest. The lack of credible governance was compounded by the fact that most colonies were economic loss-makers at independence, lacking both a productive economic base and a taxation system to effectively extract resources from economic activity. Among the rare states profitable at decolonization was India, to which scholars credibly argue that Uganda, Malaysia and Angola may be included. Neither did imperial powers make territorial integration a priority, and may have discouraged nascent nationalism as a danger to their rule. Many newly independent states thus found themselves impoverished, with minimal administrative capacity in a fragmented society, while faced with the expectation of immediately meeting the demands of a modern state. Such states are considered "weak" or "fragile". The "strong"-"weak" categorization is not the same as "Western"-"non-Western", as some Latin American states like Argentina and Brazil and Middle Eastern states like Egypt and Israel are considered to have "strong" administrative structures and economic infrastructure.

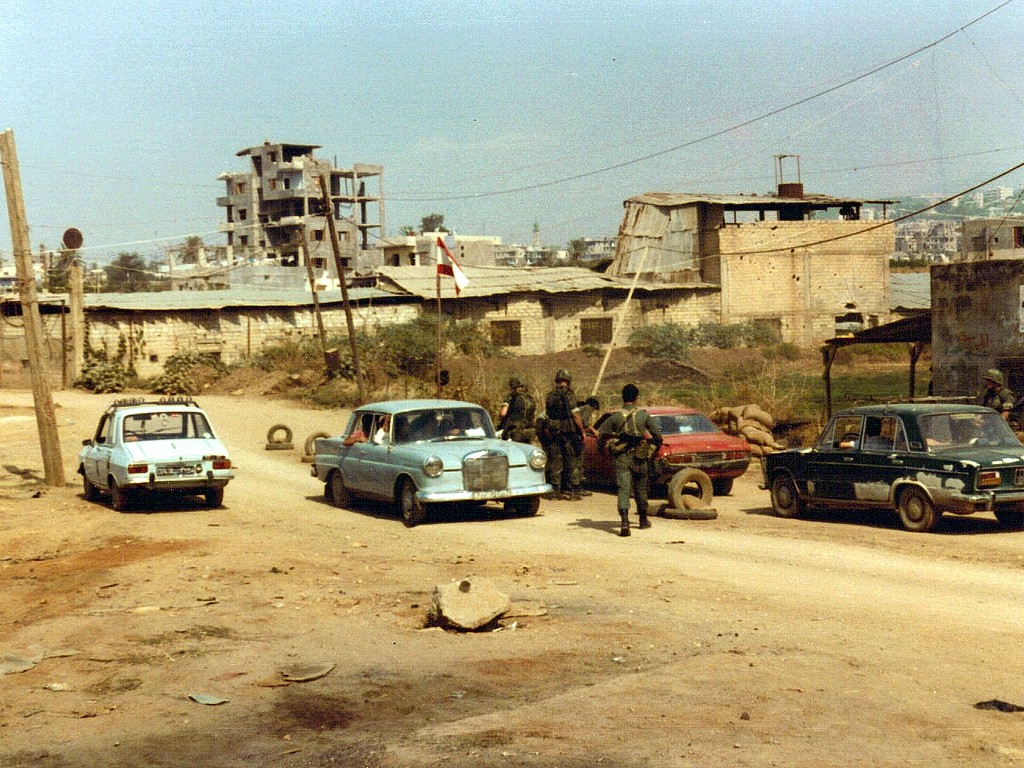
A checkpoint manned by the Lebanese army and US Marines, 1982. The Lebanese Civil War (1975–1990) was characterized by multiple foreign interventions.

Historically, the international community would have targeted weak states for territorial absorption or colonial domination or, alternatively, such states would fragment into pieces small enough to be effectively administered and secured by a local power. However, international norms towards sovereignty changed in the wake of World War II in ways that support and maintain the existence of weak states. Weak states are given de jure sovereignty equal to that of other states, even when they do not have de facto sovereignty or control of their own territory, including the privileges of international diplomatic recognition and an equal vote in the United Nations. Further, the international community offers development aid to weak states, which helps maintain the facade of a functioning modern state by giving the appearance that the state is capable of fulfilling its implied responsibilities of control and order. The formation of a strong international law regime and norms against territorial aggression is strongly associated with the dramatic drop in the number of interstate wars, though it has also been attributed to the effect of the Cold War or to the changing nature of economic development. Consequently, military aggression that results in territorial annexation became increasingly likely to prompt international condemnation, diplomatic censure, a reduction in international aid or the introduction of economic sanction, or, as in the case of 1990 invasion of Kuwait by Iraq, international military intervention to reverse the territorial aggression. Similarly, the international community has largely refused to recognize secessionist regions, while keeping some secessionist self-declared states such as Somaliland in diplomatic recognition limbo. While there is not a large body of academic work examining the relationship, Hironaka's statistical study found a correlation that suggests that every major international anti-secessionist declaration increased the number of ongoing civil wars by +10%, or a total +114% from 1945 to 1997. The diplomatic and legal protection given by the international community, as well as economic support to weak governments and discouragement of secession, thus had the unintended effect of encouraging civil wars.

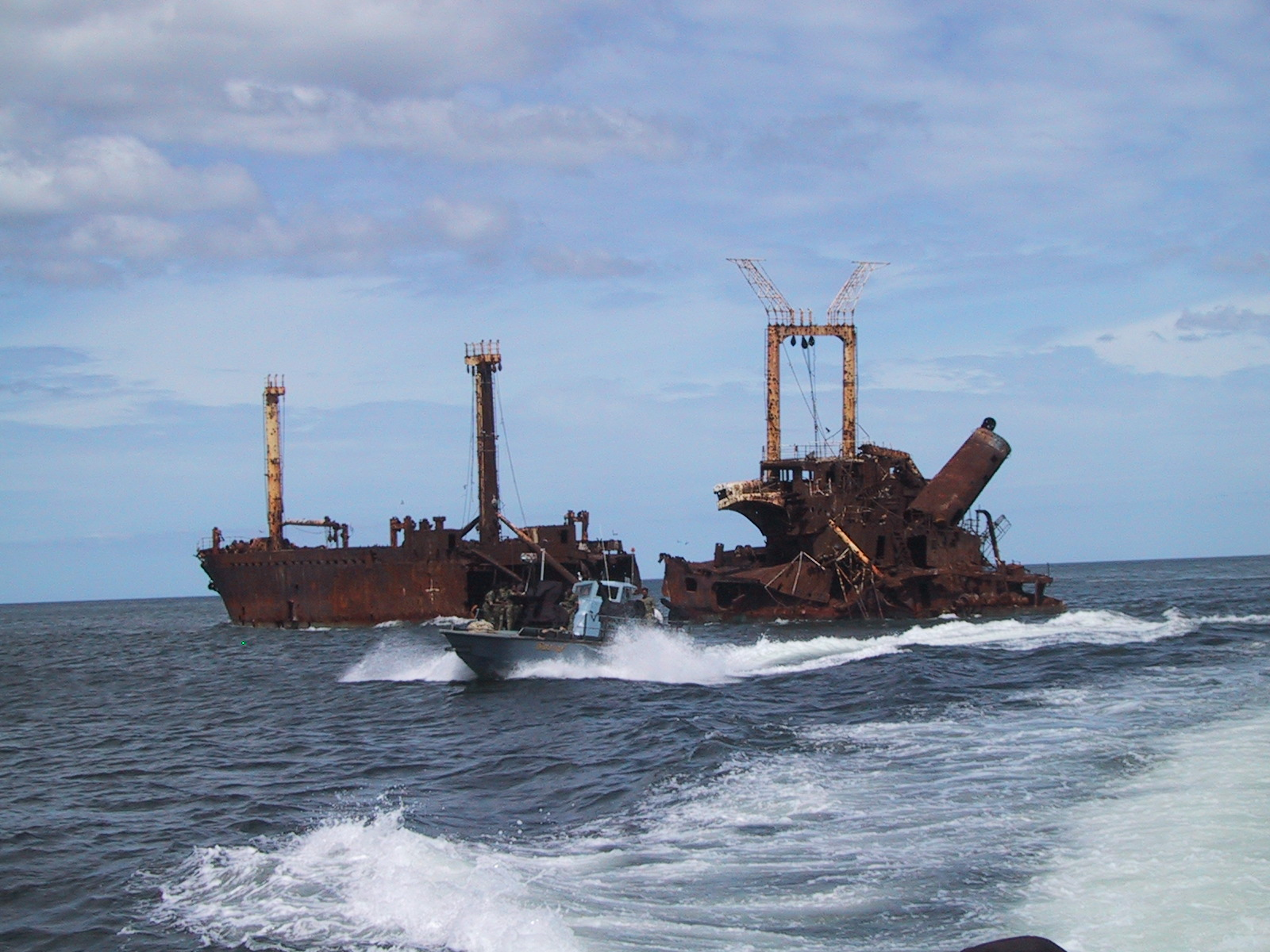
A fast attack boat of the rebel LTTE in Sri Lanka in 2003 passes the hulk of an LTTE supply ship that had been sunk by government aircraft, Sri Lankan Civil War (1983–2009).

==== Interventions by outside powers ====
There has been an enormous amount of international intervention in civil wars since 1945 that some have argued served to extend wars. According to Patrick M. Regan in his book Civil Wars and Foreign Powers (2000) about 2/3rds of the 138 intrastate conflicts between the end of World War II and 2000 saw international intervention, with the United States intervening in 35 of these conflicts. While intervention has been practiced since the international system has existed, its nature changed substantially. It became common for both the state and opposition group to receive foreign support, allowing wars to continue well past the point when domestic resources had been exhausted. Superpowers, such as the European great powers, had always felt no compunction in intervening in civil wars that affected their interests, while distant regional powers such as the United States could declare the interventionist Monroe Doctrine of 1821 for events in its Central American "backyard". However, the large population of weak states after 1945 allowed intervention by former colonial powers, regional powers and neighboring states who themselves often had scarce resources.

On average, a civil war with interstate intervention was 300% longer than those without. When disaggregated, a civil war with intervention on only one side is 156% longer, while when intervention occurs on both sides the average civil war is longer by an additional 92%. If one of the intervening states was a superpower, a civil war is a further 72% longer; a conflict such as the Angolan Civil War, in which there is two-sided foreign intervention, including by a superpower (actually, two superpowers in the case of Angola), would be 538% longer on average than a civil war without any international intervention.

=== Effect of the Cold War ===
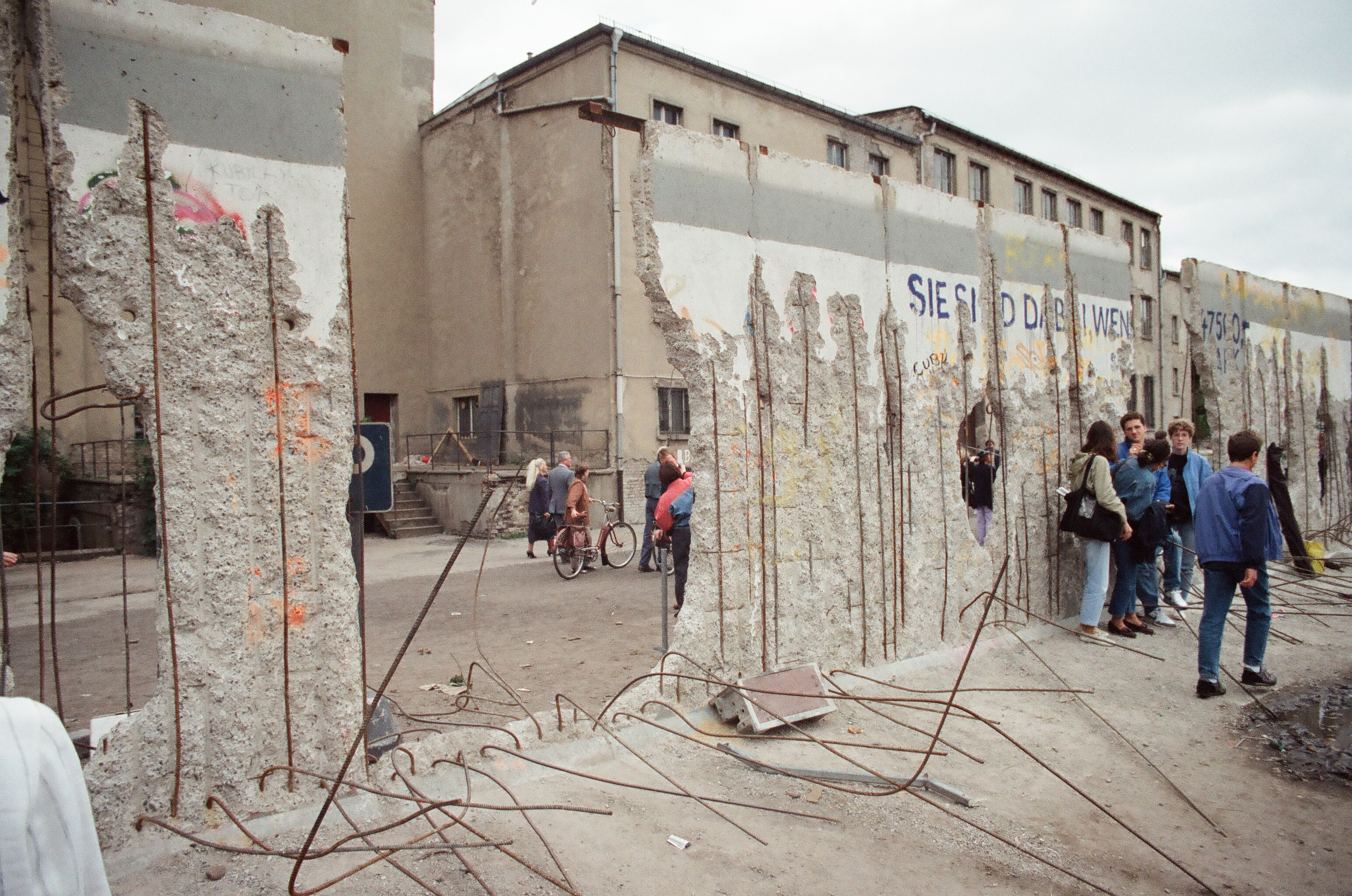
Fall and demolition of the Berlin Wall at Checkpoint Charlie (1990)

The Cold War (1947–1991) provided a global network of material and ideological support that often helped perpetuate civil wars, which were mainly fought in weak ex-colonial states rather than the relatively strong states that were aligned with the Warsaw Pact and North Atlantic Treaty Organization.

In some cases, superpowers would superimpose Cold War ideology onto local conflicts, while in others local actors using Cold War ideology would attract the attention of a superpower to obtain support. A notable example is the Greek Civil War (1946–1949), which erupted shortly after the end of World War II. This conflict saw the communist-dominated Democratic Army of Greece, supported by Yugoslavia and the Soviet Union, opposing the Kingdom of Greece, which was backed by the United Kingdom and the United States under the Truman Doctrine and the Marshall Plan.

Using a separate statistical evaluation than used above for interventions, civil wars that included pro- or anti-communist forces lasted 141% longer than the average non-Cold War conflict, while a Cold War civil war that attracted superpower intervention resulted in wars typically lasting over three times as long as other civil wars. Conversely, the end of the Cold War marked by the fall of the Berlin Wall in 1989 resulted in a reduction in the duration of Cold War civil wars of 92% or, phrased another way, a roughly ten-fold increase in the rate of resolution of Cold War civil wars. Lengthy Cold War-associated civil conflicts that ground to a halt include the wars of Guatemala (1960–1996), El Salvador (1979–1991) and Nicaragua (1970–1990).

=== Post-2003 ===
According to Barbara F. Walter, post-2003 civil wars are different from previous civil wars in that most are situated in Muslim-majority countries; most of the rebel groups espouse radical Islamist ideas and goals; and most of these radical groups pursue transnational rather than national aims. She attributes this shift to changes in information technology, especially the advent of the Web 2.0 in the early 2000s.

== Termination ==
Civil wars can end with victory of one side, draws, negotiation and peace treaties, ceasefires or continue as frozen conflicts. The effectiveness of peacekeeping is widely debated, in part because the data suffers from selection bias; as Fortna has argued, peacekeepers select themselves into difficult cases. When controlling for this effect, Forta holds that peacekeeping is resoundingly successful in shortening wars. However, other scholars disagree. Knaus and Stewart are extremely skeptical as to the effectiveness of interventions, holding that they can only work when they are performed with extreme caution and sensitivity to context, a strategy they label 'principled incrementalism'. Few interventions, for them, have demonstrated such an approach. Other scholars offer more specific criticisms; Dube and Naidu, for instance, show that US military aid, a less conventional form of intervention, seems to be siphoned off to paramilitaries thus exacerbating violence. Weinstein holds more generally that interventions might disrupt processes of 'autonomous recovery' whereby civil war contributes to state-building. Power sharing electoral systems can reduce the recurrence of civil wars.

== See also ==
- Insurgency
- Non-international armed conflict
- List of civil wars
- List of wars of independence
- The Logic of Violence in Civil War
- Wars of national liberation
