= Alexander Betts (political scientist) =

British political scientist

Alexander Betts FBA
- Born: 17 January 1980 (age 46); Bristol, England

Academic background
- Education: University of Oxford

Academic work
- Discipline: Political Science, International Development
- Institutions: University of Oxford

Alexander Betts FBA is the Pro-Vice-Chancellor for External Engagement, Sport, and Community at the University of Oxford. He also holds the post of Professor of Forced Migration and International Affairs, William Golding Senior Fellow in Politics at Brasenose College, and Associate Head (Graduate and Research Training) of Oxford's Social Sciences Division.

Betts is recognized for his extensive research on the political economy of refugee assistance and has been influential in shaping policy and debates on global migration governance

== Academic career ==
Betts was born in Bristol in the Southwest of the United Kingdom.

He completed his undergraduate degree at Durham University. He then completed an MSc at Bristol University, followed by an MPhil and DPhil from the University of Oxford. His doctoral thesis, completed in under 18 months while working at the United Nations High Commissioner for Refugees (UNHCR) in Geneva, examined the conditions under which international cooperation can address protracted refugee situations. His thesis won the Winchester Prize for best DPhil in International Relations and this work was later published as Protection by Persuasion: International Cooperation in the Refugee Regime (2009).

He was appointed Rose Junior Research Fellow in International Relations at Lady Margaret Hall, Oxford in 2006, before becoming Hedley Bull Research Fellow in International Relations at Wadham College, Oxford, between 2007 and 2010. He then spent a year as a post-doc at Stanford University's Center for International Security and Cooperation (CISAC), before becoming Associate Professor in Refugee and Forced Migration Studies in the Oxford Department of International Development at the University of Oxford in 2011. He became Professor of Forced Migration and International Affairs in 2015.

He was Director of the Refugee Studies Centre between 2014 and 2017. In 2019, he was appointed Associate Head (Graduate and Research Training) of the Social Sciences Division at the University of Oxford, also becoming Director of the Economic and Social Research Council's 'Grand Union' Doctoral Training Partnership, which includes Oxford University, Open University, and Brunel University London.

Since 2017, he has led the Refugee Economies Programme at the University of Oxford, which is funded by the IKEA Foundation, which supports the socio-economic inclusion of refugees through a longitudinal study following the economic lives of 16,000 refugees and host community members in Ethiopia, Kenya, and Uganda.

In 2021, he co-founded the Oxford SDG Impact Lab, which supports students from across Oxford University to collaborate with business to deliver the United Nations Sustainable Development Goals. He also co-created the Refugee-Led Research Hub in Nairobi, Kenya which supports aspiring researchers with lived experience of displacement to become leaders in Refugee and Forced Migration Studies.

== Research ==
Most of his research is on refugees in world politics. He is centrally concerned with the question of what makes the global refugee system effective, and on reconciling the tension between national interests and refugee rights. Under what conditions are nation-states willing to protect, assist, and integrate refugees? What is the role of international institutions in influencing the behaviour of states? And what role do refugees themselves play as actors within the refugee system?

The other strand of his work focuses on the relationship between international development and forced displacement, exploring the socio-economic integration of refugees within host countries. What explains the variation in refugees' welfare outcomes? What shapes host community attitudes towards refugees? What explains the mobility and migration choices of refugees? Much of this research has taken place in East Africa.

Betts' main research monographs are:

Protection by Persuasion: International Cooperation in the Refugee Regime (Cornell University Press, 2009), explores the history of responsibility-sharing in the global refugee regime. Theoretically, it identifies the cooperation problem in the refugee regime as being a 'suasion game' in which bargaining is characterized by asymmetric power relations between Northern donor/resettlement states and Southern host states. It argues that this North-South impasse has sometimes been overcome through 'issue-linkages', connecting refugee protection to policy fields in which states have strategic interests, such as migration, security, and development. Empirically, it examines the history of four UNHCR-led initiatives: the International Conferences on Refugees in Africa (1981 and 1984), the Indo-Chinese Comprehensive Plan of Action (1989), the International Conference on Refugees in Central America (1989), and the Convention Plus initiative (2003-5).

Survival Migration: Failed Governance and the Crisis of Displacement (Cornell University Press, 2013), explores new drivers of displacement that fall outside dominant interpretations of who is a 'refugee' under the 1951 Convention on the Status of Refugees. Theoretically, it uses the concept of 'survival migration' to highlight people who flee serious harm but are not generally recognized as refugees. Empirically, it uses qualitative fieldwork to explain variation in African state responses to people fleeing serious socio-economic rights deprivations in fragile states, examining national responses to people fleeing Somalia, the Democratic Republic of Congo, and Zimbabwe. It shows that where legal norms are ambiguous, elite political interests shape the boundaries of inclusion and exclusion.

Mobilising the Diaspora: How Refugees Challenge Authoritarianism (Cambridge University Press, 2016, with Will Jones), examines the political lives of refugees, focusing particularly on how refugee diasporas mobilize to challenge authoritarianism in their countries of origin. Theoretically, it offers a social constructivist account of diaspora formation, suggesting that diasporas are not pre-determined but defined by their political mobilization vis-a-vis the homeland. They have 'lifecycles', emerging, expanding, and sometimes waning. Empirically, it examines the history of Rwandan and Zimbabwean diaspora, revealing the important role played by internal and external elites in mobilizing and sustaining diasporic engagement.

The Global Governed? Refugees as Providers of Protection and Assistance (Cambridge University Press, 2020, with Kate Pincock and Evan Easton-Calabria) explores the role of refugee-led organizations (RLOs) in providing social protection. Theoretically, it challenges the dominant provider/beneficiary relationship within global governance. Building upon the 'post-development' literature, it uses a 'post-protection' lens to critically examine the interaction between international institutions and in refugee-led organizations. Empirically, it focuses on RLOs in camps and cities in Kenya and Uganda, to reveal how, despite a lack of funding or recognition, RLOs provide important and diverse forms of social protection. The RLOs that thrive generally do so by bypassing formal humanitarian governance and creating their own transnational networks.

The Wealth of Refugees: How Displaced People Can Build Economies (Oxford University Press, 2021) explores what sustainable refugee policies look like in an age of displacement characterized by rising numbers and declining political will. It is divided into four main sections. 1) Ethics — what is right? 2) Economics — what works? 3) Politics — what persuades? 4) Policy — what next? It argues that all rich states have an obligation to support spontaneous arrival asylum, resettlement/complementary pathways, and to support refugees hosted in neighboring countries. However, realistically, the majority of refugees will remain in countries that neighbor conflict and crisis, and so a development-based approach to refugee protection offers the most viable way forwards. Drawing upon original qualitative and quantitative data from Uganda, Kenya, and Ethiopia, it reveals the limitations of existing 'self-reliance' programmes and the ambivalent and often disingenuous politics that underpins them. It argues for a re-think in how protection is delivered in refugees' regions or origins, outlining an approach that builds upon the skills, talents, and aspirations of refugees, leverages socio-economic rights, and invests in infrastructure, public services, and job creation for both refugees and proximate host communities.

Social Science: A Very Short Introduction (Oxford University Press, 2023) provides an accessible and engaging introduction to the major questions, methods, and impacts of the social sciences. It addresses what social science is, why it matters, and how it contributes to understanding and shaping the world. The book explores the foundations and evolution of disciplines such as sociology, anthropology, economics, political science, and human geography, while also highlighting the value of interdisciplinary approaches to solving global challenges. Emphasising the role of ethics and reflexivity in research, it invites readers to consider how knowledge is produced and used across academic, policy, and public domains. Aimed at a broad readership, it is designed to demystify the social sciences and encourage critical engagement with contemporary social issues.

== Impact ==
Betts' work has been influential in reframing refugees as economic contributors, and increasing recognition and funding for refugee-led organisations. He has been active in public and policy debates in relation to the Syrian, Venezuelan, and Ukrainian refugee crises.

Together with Paul Collier, he developed an idea to employ Syrian refugees in already existing Special Economic Zones in Jordan, first published in a piece in Foreign Affairs. The proposal adopted as a pilot project by Jordan, the UK, the EU, and the World Bank, which became known as the 'Jordan Compact’. The pilot was described by News Deeply as “one of the most important economic experiments in the world today.” Despite its limitations, the Compact opened the Jordanian labour market to refugees and led to 200,000 work permits being granted to Syrian refugees in Jordan.

In 2017, he co-authored Refuge: Transforming a Broken Refugee System with Paul Collier, which was recognised by The Economist as one of the best books of 2017, and was final shortlisted for the Estoril Global Issues Distinguished Book Prize.

== Honours ==
He was named in Foreign Policy magazine's top 100 global thinkers in 2016, as a World Economic Forum Young Global Leader in 2016, in Thinkers 50's radar list of emerging business influencers in 2017, as a Bloomberg Businessweek 'gamechanger' in 2017, and as a European Young Leader by Friends of Europe in 2020.

He won the Economic and Social Research Council's Outstanding International Impact Prize in 2021, for work on 'Refugee-Led Social Protection During COVID-19'. He was also awarded the International Studies Association's 'Ethnicity, Nationalism, and Migration' Distinguished Book Prize for The Wealth of Refugees in 2022.

He has received fellowships and grants from the British Academy, the MacArthur Foundation, and the Economic and Social Research Council (ESRC), among others. He is Fellow of the Royal Society of Arts (FRSA) and of the Academy of Social Sciences (FAcSS). He was elected a Fellow of the British Academy in 2025.

== Books ==
- Protection by Persuasion: International Cooperation in the Refugee Regime, Cornell University Press, 2009
- Forced Migration and Global Politics, Wiley-Blackwell, 2009
- Refugees in International Relations, co-edited with Gil Loescher, Oxford University Press 2010,
- Global Migration Governance, Oxford University Press, 2011
- UNHCR: The Politics and Practice of Refugee Protection, with Gil Loescher and James Milner Routledge, 2012
- Survival Migration: Failed Governance and the Crisis of Displacement Cornell University Press, 2013
- Implementation in World Politics: How Norms Change Practice, co-edited with Phil Orchard Oxford University Press, 2014
- Mobilising the Diaspora: How Refugees Challenge Authoritarianism, with Will Jones, Cambridge University Press, 2016
- Refugee Economies: Forced Displacement and Development, with Louise Bloom, Josiah Kaplan, Naohiko Omata, Oxford University Press 2016
- Refuge: Transforming a Broken Refugee System, with Paul Collier, Penguin Allen Lane, 2017
- The Global Governed? Refugees as Providers of Protection and Assistance, with Kate Pincock and Evan Easton-Calabria Cambridge University Press, 2020
- The Wealth of Refugees: How Displaced People Can Build Economies, Oxford University Press, 2021
- Very Short Introductions: Social Science, Oxford University Press, 2023

== Selected talks ==
- 'Refugees as a Resource' at Skoll World Forum, October 2016
- 'Our Refugee System is Failing. Here's How We Can Fix It.' at TED Conference, March 2016
- 'It's Not About Migration, It's About Economic Transformation', TEDx Oxford, April 2019
- 'Why Brexit Happened and What to Do Next?' at TED Conference, July 2016
- 'What If We Helped Refugees to Help Themselves', TEDx Vienna, November 2015
- 'Making Sense of Brexit' at Business of Fashion, December 2016

== Other achievements ==
He is former European debating champion. He has run the London Marathon in 2:38.24 and has a personal best half marathon time of 1:11.51
