= Colin Kidd =

Scottish historian

Colin Kidd OBE FRSE FSA Scot FRHistS FBA
- Born: Colin Craig Kidd; 5 May 1964 (age 62)

Academic background
- Education: Gonville and Caius College, Cambridge (MA); All Souls College, Oxford (DPhil)
- Thesis: Scottish Whig Historians and the Creation of an Anglo-British Identity 1689–1830 (1993)
- Doctoral advisor: John Robertson

Academic work
- Institutions: University of St Andrews; Queen's University Belfast; University of Glasgow
- Notable works: British Identities Before Nationalism (1999); The Forging of Races (2006); Union and Unionisms (2008)

Colin Craig Kidd (born 5 May 1964) is a historian who specialises in American and Scottish history. He is Professor of History at the University of St Andrews, after being Professor of Intellectual History and the History of Political Thought at Queen's University Belfast, where he has worked since he left the University of Glasgow in 2010.

Kidd is a fellow of All Souls College, Oxford, and a contributor to the London Review of Books, where he commentates on current affairs, economics and politics, as well as reviewing literary works. Kidd was an undergraduate at Gonville and Caius College, Cambridge, before winning the Prize Fellowship at All Souls to complete his Doctor of Philosophy. Before St Andrews, Kidd held fellowships at Belfast, Glasgow, Oxford and Harvard Universities. In 2017 he delivered the British Academy's Raleigh Lecture on History.

His own literary works include: Subverting Scotland's Past: Scottish Whig Historians and the Creation of an Anglo-British Identity 1689–1830 (1993); British Identities Before Nationalism: Ethnicity and Nationhood in the Atlantic World, 1600–1800 (1999); The Forging of Races: Race and Scripture in the Protestant Atlantic World, 1600–2000 (2006); and Union and Unionisms: Political Thought in Scotland, 1500–2000 (2008). All these are published by Cambridge University Press.

Kidd was appointed Officer of the Order of the British Empire (OBE) in the 2023 New Year Honours for services to history, culture and politics.
