= The Logic of Violence in Civil War =

2006 book by Stathis N. Kalyvas

- Author: Stathis N. Kalyvas
- Language: English
- Genre: Non-fiction
- Publisher: Cambridge University Press
- Publication date: May 2006
- ISBN: 9780521670043

The Logic of Violence in Civil War is a book by Greek author and political scientist Stathis N. Kalyvas which challenges the conventional view of violence in civil wars as irrational. The book presents a theory for levels of violence, as well as why selective violence (targeting individuals) and indiscriminate violence (targeting collectives) are at varying times employed in civil wars.

Kalyvas argues that higher levels of violence happen in territory under near-hegemonic rule (one group has overwhelming but incomplete dominance), as opposed to completely fragmented territory (no group has control) or fully controlled territory. He further argues that violence will tend towards being indiscriminate in territory under fragmented control but be selective in territory under near-hegemonic control.

The book offers a methodologically individualist account of civil wars that focuses on instrumental action by rational individuals. The book therefore focuses on the micro foundations of war, rather on the macro aspects of civil war that are dominant in the political violence literature.

Kalyvas is a noted in political science for his analysis of the dynamics of polarization and civil war, ethnic and non-ethnic violence, and the formation of cleavages and identities. He has also researched party politics and political institutions in Europe. He is a professor at the University of Oxford. In 2020, Scott Straus described the book as "one of the most influential in the field" of political violence.

== Background ==
According to Kalyvas, he struggled to convince political scientists that micro-level violence was a topic worthy of study in political science prior to the publication of the book, as the focus in the existing political science literature on violence was overwhelmingly on collective uses of violence. His early papers were rejected by political science journals.

== Contents ==
=== The logic behind violence in civil wars ===
Since at least the French Revolution there has been a record of extremely violent events in the context of civil wars, and such apparent massive irrational behaviour among combatants and civilians (a sort of unexpected Hobbesian disease) has been widely examined by the literature. Previous works tried to insert violence as a phenomenon directly derived from the (military) logic of civil war using anecdotal accounts or cleavage-based analyses, but overlooked the fact that several manifestations of violence can be exogenous to that logic. Civil war can be an exogenous shock onto some societies that can activate invisible networks of grievances and feuds among their individuals.

Kalyvas' book is focused on explaining that this sort of violence common in civil wars, namely that violence that is significant by its number of victims, its ‘barbarism’ (or brutality) and the fact that both victims and executioners have had a peaceful performance in their past interaction (i.e. neighbours). The research tries to be confined to that kind of violence in civil wars, and the work principally provides an explanation to the spatial variance of that dependent variable. Temporal approaches are suggested, but not deeply developed in comparative terms.

As civil wars are frequently battled by means of some sort of irregular warfare by one or both contenders, Kalyvas embodies his explanation in the constraints of irregular wars, specifically the ability of competitors to hide themselves behind civilian population, and the uncertainty around who is an enemy and who is neutral in such an environment. Enemies can be hidden among the apparently supporters of a community, and contenders can only deal with such informational problems in an efficient ways by exercising violence against previously selected defectors. The efficient way of doing so is waiting for spontaneous civilian informers, an action more critical in highly competed areas, where powers are balanced and, consequently, sovereignty is fragmented. On the other hand, the probability of denunciations grows with the level of control that one side has in a given area. The more the control one side has, the risk of retaliation by the other side that informers have to face is less, but the probability of real defection and shifting to the other side is lessened also, compromising the credibility of those numerous and spontaneous informers. Political actors do not search for violence as the first-best option to prevent both shifts and defections, because they generally prefer selective, limited violence (that reduces the probability of shifts and defections by deterrence) to arbitrary, massive violence (that increases the likelihood of those outcomes).

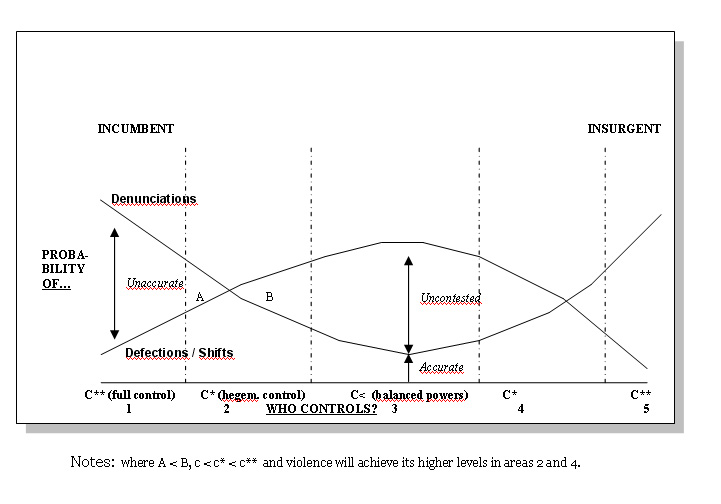
The Logic of Violence in Civil War

The mechanism follows a tree iterating game where political actors decide if they want to use violence, depending on the degree of control over that territory, but they confront an “identification problem”. Then, individuals decide if the benefits of denunciation (old feuds and grievances) are higher than the risks of doing so, given the level of control of the own side in the territory. A group of institutions to make denunciation easier and more anonymous are required to increase the likelihood of that event, but they perform worse in rural areas, where denouncers are more visible. If denunciation and violence take place, the victim's kin can either refrain from retaliating or choose to retaliate, depending on the risks of doing so given the level of control of their side in that given territory. When that level is balanced for both sides, the equilibrium can result in either indiscriminate violence or no violence at all due to mutual deterrence.

This approach to violence as a joint process, where violence only takes place when civilians and political powers cooperate given their interests and cost-benefits calculations, lets the author to develop a model that predicts on one hand the likelihood of violence in a given area; on the other, it clarifies the moral hazard problem political contenders confront because the abundance of informers is inversely proportional to their usefulness, as we saw above. And, to sum up, that parsimonious model surprise readers because it is able to predict levels (variation) of violence from a micro approach.

=== The evidence ===
To run a convincing empirical test of that model, the author collected regional data of the Greek Civil War, and next to two thirds of violence variation is successfully predicted by the model. And additionally, to test its validity outside the Greek sample, the model is successfully confronted with a large variety of historical and anecdotal accounts about civil wars around the world.

Those findings, both theoretical and empirical, have several significant implications. One of them is that violence in any civil war is a function of civilians’ previous feuds among them and the distribution and degree of control of the contenders over the territory in conflict. The former is given before the war, but it only takes the shape of violence jointly to the latter, namely when sovereignty is fragmented by competing powers.

These findings also explain why contenders will prefer to use selective to indiscriminate violence, and when the latter will take place. The behavioural microfoundations established in the game-theoretical model, and the principal-agent dilemmas the players confront constantly, let to this work to provide an answer to violent outcomes based on incentives and rational behaviour, instead of on gut reactions and irrational impulses.

=== Open extensions ===
Leaving apart those implications, the argument of the manuscript arises some questions that are partially answered by the author, specifically if the model is applicable both to ethnic and non-ethnic violence during civil wars, or if the model is efficient predicting the sort and intensity of violence when some complexity is added, namely more than two players (i.e. Colombian conflict), non-unitary players (adding some proxy of ‘internal cohesion’ to the apparatus of both contenders, since soldiers or militias are at the same time agents of one power and individuals with their own private feuds, grievances and family to defend; and they can commit violence or avoid it even when the rational strategy of the unitary contender is the opposite). Additionally, since the temporal dynamics of the civil war are just roughly outlined, one can ask if frontiers between the five defined categories of controlled areas would be blurred depending on the kind of military strategies that take place. Mutual blitzkriegs and positional wars in a vast, underpopulated territory can make very difficult for players to know the real degree of control that both powers have in any given territory, especially in those considered as “3” in Kalyvas’ categorization (see figure). In other words, trench wars tend to create stable areas, and thus, concentrated violence in disputed regions. The logic of violence in these wars (also called Conventional civil wars) is different from that described by Kalyvas, which applies to Irregular civil wars. Conversely, military strategies that rely in quick movements and constant interchange of lands tend to spread violence across the territory.

== Reception ==
The book was favorably reviewed by Jóhanna Kristín Birnir (of the University of Maryland), who wrote, "this book combines much of the best that comparative politics has to offer: conceptually clear and rigorous theorizing based on insights from extensive field work, and tested in a methodologically solid fashion on a wealth of quantitative and qualitative data. The conclusions constitute a major contribution to our understanding of violence in civil conflict."

Laia Balcells praised the book for its contributions to the political violence and civil war literatures. In criticisms of the book, she argues that Kalyvas's formal model only covers the tactical dimension of civil war, but not the strategic dimension. She also argues that armed groups in full control of territory should have an incentive to gather information about civilians, which should prompt violence.

== Related references ==
- Laia Balcells, "Rivalry and Revenge: Violence against Civilians in Conventional Civil Wars," International Studies Quarterly, Vol. 54, No. 2 (June 2010), pp. 291–313.
- Laia Balcells, "Continuation of Politics by Two Means: Direct and Indirect Violence in Civil War," Journal of Conflict Resolution, Vol. 55, No. 3 (June 2011), pp. 397–422.
- Ron E. Hassner, "To Halve and to Hold: Conflicts Over Sacred Space and the Problem of Indivisibility," Security Studies, Vol. 12, No. 4 (Summer 2003), pp. 1–33.
- Stathis Kalyvas, The Logic of Violence in Civil War (2006) Cambridge: Cambridge University Press. ISBN 0-521-85409-1. Preview at Google Books.
- Stathis Kalyvas, The Absence of Suicide Missions (2005). In Diego Gambetta(ed.), Making Sense of Suicide Missions.Oxford: Oxford University Press, 209–232.
- Stathis Kalyvas, Warfare in Civil Wars (2005) in Isabelle Duyvesteyn and Jan Angstrom (eds.), Rethinking the Nature of War. Abingdton: Frank Cass, 88–108.
- Stathis Kalyvas, The Urban Bias in Research on Civil Wars (2004) in Security Studies 13:3, 1–31.
- Stathis Kalyvas, The Paradox of Terrorism in Civil Wars (2004) in Journal of Ethics 8:1, 97–138.
- Stathis Kalyvas, The Ontology of "Political Violence:" Action and Identity in Civil Wars (2003) in Perspectives on Politics 1:3, 475–494.
- Stathis Kalyvas, "New" and "Old" Civil Wars: A Valid Distinction? (2001) in World Politics 54:1, 99–118.
- Stathis Kalyvas, Leftist Violence During the Occupation (2000) In Mark Mazower After the War was Over: Reconstructing Family, State, and Nation in Greece, 1944–1960. Princeton: Princeton University Press, 142–183.
- Stathis Kalyvas and Laia Balcells, International System and Technologies of Rebellion: How the Cold War Shaped Internal Conflict. American Political Science Review. August 2010 (Vol. 104 No. 3): 415–429.
- Ariel Merari, "Terrorism as a Strategy in Insurgency," Terrorism and Political Violence, Vol. 5, No. 4 (Winter 1993), pp. 213–251.
- Monica Duffy Toft, The Geography of Ethnic Conflict (Princeton, NJ: Princeton University Press, 2003), ISBN 0-691-12383-7.
- Monica Duffy Toft, “Issue Indivisibility and Time Horizons as Rationalist Explanations for War,” Security Studies, Vol. 15, No. 1 (January–March 2006), pp. 34–69.

== See also ==
- List of politics-related topics
- List of civil wars
- Civilian victimization
