= Stathis Kalyvas =

Greek university teacher

Prof. Stathis Kalyvas
- Στάθης Ν. Καλύβας
- Born: March 7, 1964 (age 62); Corfu
- Occupation: Professor of political science
- Known for: Civil war, ethnicity, political violence
- Awards: Woodrow Wilson Awards, European Academy of Sociology Book Award, Luebbert Best Book Award, J. David Greenstone Prize

Academic background
- Education: University of Chicago

Academic work
- Discipline: Political science
- Sub-discipline: Civil war, conflict
- Institutions: University of Chicago, Ohio State, Oxford, Yale
- Notable ideas: "New Wave" school of Modern Greek historiography; political violence, rationality of violence in civil conflict

Stathis N. Kalyvas (Greek: Στάθης Ν. Καλύβας; born 7 March 1964) is a Greek political scientist who is the Gladstone Professor of Government, at the University of Oxford and a University Academic Fellow at All Souls College, Oxford.

Kalyvas held the Arnold Wolfers Chair in Political Science at Yale University (from 2003 to 2017), where he founded the Program on Order, Conflict, and Violence; prior to that, he held professorships at the University of Chicago, New York University, and Ohio State University. He has also conducted research at the Peace Research Institute Oslo. Kalyvas has written extensively on civil wars, ethnicity, and political violence.

He was a main founder, with Nikos Marantzides, of a current in Modern Greek historiography called the "New Wave" which was focused principally on the study of the Greek Civil War. Among his works is The Logic of Violence in Civil War, which challenges the view of violence in civil wars as irrational.

== Early life ==
Kalyvas was born on the island Corfu (Kerkyra) in 1964, where his father was serving in the Hellenic Coast Guard at the time. His family later moved to Athens and it was there that he spent his early childhood; residing first in Kolonos, and later in Nea Smyrni. His mother was French, and at the age of ten, the family moved to Marseille, where he spent his adolescent years and completed his general education.

== Education and career ==
Kalyvas completed his undergraduate studies at the National and Kapodistrian University of Athens in 1986, and received his PhD diploma in Political Science at the University of Chicago in 1993. Besides Yale, he also taught at Ohio State University from 1993 to 1994, NYU from 1994 to 2000, and the University of Chicago from 2000 to 2003.

He has also been a visiting professor or scholar at Northwestern University, Columbia University, Witten/Herdecke University, Instituto Carlos III-Juan March, the Max Planck Institute, and European University. He has written, amongst other works, The Logic of Violence in Civil War (Cambridge University Press, 2006) and The Rise of Christian Democracy in Europe (Cornell University Press, 1996). He is a contributor and editor to the book Order, Conflict, and Violence (Cambridge University Press, 2008), and more than fifty scholarly articles in five languages.

He has been a frequent contributor to the newspaper Kathimerini since 2009. His articles and have been published in multiple mass-media outlets, such as the New York Times, Financial Times, Foreign Affairs, Foreign Policy, and The Atlantic.

He has been a member of the Konstantinos Karamanlis Institute for Democracy, a think tank affiliated with the New Democracy party.

In 2017, it was announced that he had been appointed William Gladstone Professor of Government and a fellow at All Souls College, Oxford.

His current research is in world trends in political life and civil wars. His research has been funded by the Harry Frank Guggenheim Foundation, the United States Institute of Peace, the Folke Bernadotte Academy, and the Alexander S. Onassis Foundation.

In 2021, he participated in a panel at the Bodossaki Foundation, which had the principal theme "Action Plan for the University of 2030: Principles and Positions."

His book Katastrofes ke Thriamboi ("Calamities and Coups"), a history of modern Greece, was adapted in 2022 for television by Skai TV, and produced under the same title.

In December 2023, Professor Kalyvas by honorary invitation took up the presidency of the administrative council of the Stavros Niarchos Foundation Cultural Center.

== Historigraphy ==
=== New Wave ===
The work of Kalyvas is regarded as revisionist, that inspects with fresh eyes, called meta-revisionist, which wishes to variously differentiate and dispute historiographic "certainties" and "orthodoxies".These new revisionist eyes are also called "New Wave." The term New Wave refers to that interdisciplinary focus which is a central principle in the study of the Greek Civil War for Stathis Kalyvas and Nikos Marantzidis. The historiographic readings of the "New Wave" aroused an intense interest among historians, concerning the nature of civil conflicts, their duration, the intentions of the protagonists, and the disregarding of violence by the left.

In contrast to the view called revisionist by the historians of the generation 1960s-1970s, which had established metapolitics as the historiography of the left, a new revisionist view emerged in the final decades of the 1990s. This new revisionism was also called New Wave. The "Network for the Study of Civil War" (Δίκτυο για τη Μελέτη των Εμφυλίων Πολέμων, Díktio yia ti Meléti ton Emfilíon Polémon) became a standard bearer of the new revisionism with its principal representatives being Stathis Kalyvas and Nikos Marantzidis. A heterogeneous group of researchers, instructors, and academics have gathered in this network, expressing a variety of ideologoical positions and at the same time deriving them from a variety of scientific fields.

=== Criticism ===
His "New Wave" theses have been criticized in the learned writings of both older and younger historians.

== Awards ==
Kalyvas is the holder of a Woodrow Wilson Awards and the European Academy of Sociology Book Award; along with the Luebbert Best Book Award and the J. David Greenstone Prize of the American Political Science Association.

His work has been honored with many prizes, among which are the Woodrow Wilson Award for the best book with the theme of government, politics, or international affairs, a research grant from the Harry Frank Guggenheim Foundation, the United States Institute for Peace, the Folke Bernadotte Academy, and the Alexander S. Onassis Foundation, the European Academy of Sociology Book Award, the Luebbert Award for the best article in comparative politics (three times), and the Greenstone Award for the best book on politics and history.

In 2007, he was made a fellow of the John Simon Guggenheim Memorial Foundation. In 2008, he was elected member of the American Academy of Arts and Sciences, and in 2020, to the British Academy.

== Bibliography ==
=== In English ===
==== Books ====
- From Stagnation to Forced Adjustment: Reforms in Greece, 1974-2010 (επιμέλεια μαζί με George Pagoulatos και Haris Tsoukas), London and New York: Hurst & Co., Columbia University Press, 2012.
- Modern Greece: What everyone needs to know. New York: Oxford University Press, 2015
- Order, Conflict, Violence. New York: Cambridge University Press, 2008 (edited with Ian Shapiro and Tarek Massoud)
- The Logic of Violence in Civil War. New York: Cambridge University Press, 2006
- The Rise of Christian Democracy in Europe. Ithaca: Cornell University Press, 2006

=== In French ===
- 2015. Occupation et résistance au prisme des guerres civiles: un schéma analytique des affrontements, de la violence et de leur impact. In Pierre 5 – 5 – Laborie and François Marcot(eds.), Les comportements collectifs en France et dans l'Europe allemande, 1940–1945. Historiographie, normes, prismes, 1940–1945. Rennes: Presses Universitaires de Rennes, 2015, 63–79
- 2003. Les Guerres civiles a la fin de la Guerre Froide. In Pierre Hassner et Roland Marchal (eds), Guerres et sociétés. Etat et violence après la Guerre froide. Paris: Editions Karthala, 107–135
- 2001. Aspects méthodologiques des études des massacres: le cas de la guerre civile grecque. Revue Internationale de Politique Compareé 8:1, 23–42

=== In Greek ===
==== Books ====
- Ανορθόδοξοι πόλεμοι. Μακεδονία, Εμφύλιος, Κύπρος (επιμέλεια μαζί Βασίλη Κ. Γούναρη και Ιωάννη Δ. Στεφανίδη), Εκδόσεις Πατάκη, Αθήνα 2010, ISBN 978-960-16-3373-2.
- Εμφύλια πάθη. 23+2 Ερωτήσεις και απαντήσεις για τον εμφύλιο (μαζί με τον Νίκο Μαραντζίδη), Εκδόσεις Μεταίχμιο, Αθήνα 2015, ISBN 978-618-03-0068-0.
- Εμφύλια πάθη. 2 νέες ερωτήσεις και απαντήσεις για τον εμφύλιο (μαζί με τον Νίκο Μαραντζίδη), Εκδόσεις Μεταίχμιο, Αθήνα 2016, ISBN 978-618-03-0663-7.
- Η άνοδος της χριστιανοδημοκρατίας στην Eυρώπη, μετάφραση: Κωνσταντίνος Κολιόπουλος, επιμέλεια: Κωνσταντίνος Αρβανιτόπουλος, Σπύρος Μακρής, Εκδόσεις Ποιότητα / Ινστιτούτο Δημοκρατίας "Κωνσταντίνος Καραμανλής", Αθήνα 2003, ISBN 960-7803-28-0, ISBN 978-960-7803-28-3.
- Καταστροφές και θρίαμβοι. Οι 7 κύκλοι της σύγχρονης ελληνικής ιστορίας, μετάφραση: Νίκος Ρούσσος, Εκδόσεις Παπαδόπουλος, Αθήνα 2015, ISBN 978-960-569-334-3.
- Πού είμαστε και πού πάμε; Διατρέχοντας την κρίση (2009-2016) και ατενίζοντας το μέλλον, Εκδόσεις Μεταίχμιο, Αθήνα 2016, ISBN 978-618-03-0780-1.

==== Articles ====
- Που είμαστε και που πάμε; Διατρέχοντας την κρίση (2009-2016) και ατενίζοντας το μέλλον [Where Are We and Where Are We Going? The Crisis (2009–2016) and the Future]. Athens: Metechmio, 2016]
- και θρίαμβοι. Οι 7 κύκλοι της σύγχρονης ελληνικής ιστορίας [Disasters and Triumphs: The 7 cycles of Modern Greek History]. Athens: Papadopoulos, 2015]

==== Joint Articles ====
- Ανατομία της κρίσης [Anatomy of the Crisis] (co-authored with Thanos Veremis, George Pagoulatos, Theodoros Couloumbis, Loukas Tsoukalis, and Haridimos Tsoukas). Athens: Skai, 2011]
- Εμφύλια πάθη [Civil War Passions] (co-authored with Nikos Marantzidis). Athens: Metechmio, 2015]* Ανορθόδοξοι Πόλεμοι: Μακεδονία, Εμφύλιος, Κύπρος [Irregular Wars: Macedonia, Civil War, Cyprus] (co-edited with Vassilis K. Gounaris and Ioannis Stefanidis). Athens: Patakis, 2010]
- Διεθνείς σχέσεις. Σύγχρονη θεματολογία και προσεγγίσεις: Αφιέρωμα στον Θεόδωρο Κουλουμπή, επιμέλεια: Δ. Τριανταφύλλου, Κ. Υφαντής, Ε. Χατζηβασιλείου, Εκδόσεις Παπαζήση, Αθήνα 2008, ISBN 978-960-02-2202-9.
- Εμείς οι Έλληνες. Πολεμική ιστορία της σύγχρονης Ελλάδας: Από την Απελευθέρωση στον Ψυχρό Πόλεμο και την Κύπρο, επιμέλεια: Θάνος Βερέμης, Μιχάλης Ν. Κατσίγερας, Εκδόσεις Σκάι, Αθήνα 2011, ISBN 978-960-6845-17-8.
- Εχθρός εντός των τειχών. Όψεις του δωσιλογισμού στην Ελλάδα της Κατοχής, επιμέλεια: Ιάκωβος Μιχαηλίδης, Ηλίας Νικολακόπουλος, Χάγκεν Φλάισερ, Εκδόσεις Ελληνικά Γράμματα, Αθήνα 2006, ISBN 960-442-378-9, ISBN 978-960-442-378-1.
- Η ανατομία της κρίσης. Η παθογένεια της ελληνικής κοινωνίας μέσα από άρθρα δημοσιευμένα στην εφημερίδα "Η Καθημερινή", Εκδόσεις Σκάι, Αθήνα 2011, ISBN 978-960-482-052-8.
- Η εποχή της σύγχυσης. Η δεκαετία του '40 και η ιστοριογραφία, επιμέλεια: Γιώργος Αντωνίου, Νίκος Μαραντζίδης, Βιβλιοπωλείον της Εστίας, Αθήνα 2008, ISBN 978-960-05-1400-1.
- Ιστοριογραφία της νεότερης και σύγχρονης Ελλάδας 1833-2002. Πρακτικά Δ' διεθνούς συνεδρίου ιστορίας, επιμέλεια: Πασχάλη Μ. Κιτρομηλίδη, Τριαντάφυλλος Ε. Σκλαβενίτης, Εθνικό Ίδρυμα Ερευνών (Ε.Ι.Ε.) / Ινστιτούτο Νεοελληνικών Ερευνών, Αθήνα 2004, ISBN 960-7916-37-9, ISBN 978-960-7916-37-2.
- Μετά τον πόλεμο. Η ανασυγκρότηση της οικογένειας του έθνους και του κράτους στην Ελλάδα, 1943 - 1960, επιμέλεια: Mark Mazower, Γιάννης Καστανάρας, μετάφραση: Ειρήνη Θεοφυλακτοπούλου, Εκδόσεις Αλεξάνδρεια, Αθήνα 2003, ISBN 960-221-270-5, ISBN 978-960-221-270-7.
- Νότια Πελοπόννησος 1935-1950, επιμέλεια: Ιωάννης Καρακατσιάνης, Εκδόσεις Αλφειός, Αθήνα 2009, ISBN 978-960-6679-10-0.

== Sources ==
- Stathis Kalyvas, All Souls College, Oxford
- CV
- Stathis Kalyvas, University of Oxford, Department of Politics and International Relations
