= Paul Collier =

British development economist (born 1949)

Sir Paul Collier CBE FBA
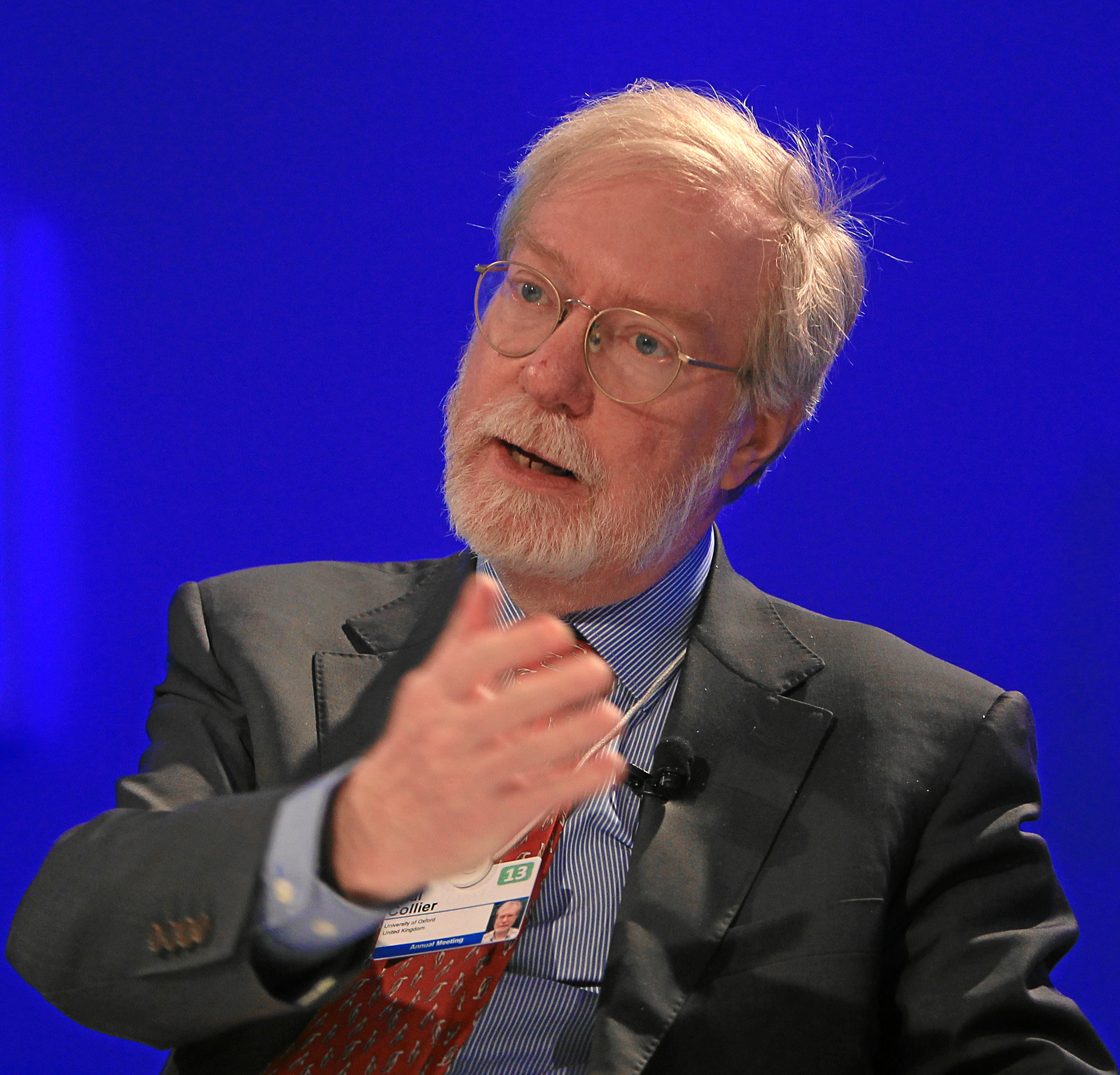
- Collier at the World Economic Forum Annual Meeting in 2013
- Born: Paul Collier; 23 April 1949 (age 77)

Academic background
- Education: University of Oxford

Academic work
- Discipline: Development economics
- Institutions: Blavatnik School of Government, International Growth Centre, Centre for the Study of African Economies, University of Oxford

Sir Paul Collier, CBE, FBA (born 23 April 1949) is a British development economist who serves as the Professor of Economics and Public Policy at the Blavatnik School of Government at the University of Oxford and co-director of the International Growth Centre. He is also a Professeur invité at Sciences Po and a Professorial Fellow of St Antony's College, Oxford.

He has served as a senior advisor to the Blair Commission for Africa and was the director of the Development Research Group at the World Bank between 1998 and 2003.

He has written for the New York Times, the Financial Times, the Wall Street Journal, and the Washington Post. In 2010 and 2011, he was named by Foreign Policy magazine on its list of top global thinkers.

From 2017-2018, Collier was the academic co-director of the LSE-Oxford Commission on State Fragility, Growth, and Development, and was a founding member of the International Growth Centre's Council on State Fragility.

== Early life and education ==
Collier was born on 23 April 1949. Collier's great-grandfather, Karl Hellenschmidt, was a German immigrant to the UK. During World War I, Collier's grandfather, Karl Hellenschmidt Jr, changed his surname from Hellenschmidt to Collier.

Collier was brought up in Sheffield where he attended King Edward VII School, a state school. Both of Collier's parents left school at the age of 12. He studied philosophy, politics, and economics at the University of Oxford, going on to also get his D.Phil from the University of Oxford.

== Academic career ==
Collier is Professor of Economics and Public Policy at the Blavatnik School of Government at the University of Oxford and co-director of the International Growth Centre. He is currently a Professeur invité at Sciences Po and a Professorial Fellow of St Antony's College, Oxford. Previously, he was a professor of economics in the Department of Economics at the University of Oxford and a professor at the Kennedy School of Government at Harvard University.

He was a founder of the Centre for the Study of African Economies at Oxford and remained its director from 1989 until 2014. From 1998-2003, he took a five-year Public Service leave during which he was the director of the Development Research Group of the World Bank.

Collier is a specialist in the political, economic and developmental predicaments of low-income countries. His research covers the causes and consequences of civil war; the effects of aid and the problems of democracy in low-income and natural resources rich societies; urbanisation in low-income countries; private investment in African infrastructure and changing organisational cultures.

He has authored numerous books, many of which earned widespread recognition. Of note are The Bottom Billion: Why the Poorest Countries are Failing and What Can Be Done About It (2007), The Plundered Planet: Why We Must, and How We Can, Manage Nature for Global Prosperity, (2010), and The Future of Capitalism: Facing the New Anxieties (2018). His most recent book, Left Behind: A New Economics for Neglected Places was published in June 2024.

Collier currently serves on the advisory board of Academics Stand Against Poverty (ASAP).

== Honours ==
Collier has received a number of prestigious awards during his career. He was appointed Commander of the Order of the British Empire (CBE) in the 2008 Birthday Honours and was knighted in the 2014 New Year Honours for services to promoting research and policy change in Africa.

In November 2014, Collier was awarded the President's Medal by the British Academy, for "his pioneering contribution in bringing ideas from research in to policy within the field of African economics." In July 2017, Collier was elected a Fellow of the British Academy (FBA), the United Kingdom's national academy for the humanities and social sciences.

He was a Silver winner in the 2025 Axiom Business Book Awards in the Economics category for his latest book, Left Behind. He has also been awarded the Adam Smith Prize by Glasgow's Philosophical Society (2023), the Citizenship Award by P&V Foundation in Belgium (2017), Richardson Lifetime Achievement Award (2016), A.SK Prize in Social Science (2013), Estoril Prize (2009), Corine Prize (2008), Lionel Gelber Prize (2008), Arthur Ross Prize (2008), and Thompson 'Current Classic' Award for the most cited article (2010).

He was given an Honorary Fellowship at Trinity College, Oxford, in 2010 and honorary doctorate degrees from Universite d'Auvergne (2007), University of Sheffield (2008), and University of Antwerp (2014).

== Work ==
=== Books ===
- Labour and Poverty in Rural Tanzania: Ujamaa and Rural Development in the United Republic of Tanzania, Oxford University Press, New York, 1991 ISBN 978-0198283157.
- The Bottom Billion: Why the Poorest Countries are Failing and What Can Be Done About It, Oxford University Press, 2007 ISBN 9780195311457.
- Wars, Guns and Votes: Democracy in Dangerous Places, Harper, March 2009 ISBN 978-0061479649.
- The Plundered Planet: Why We Must, and How We Can, Manage Nature for Global Prosperity, Oxford University Press, 2010 ISBN 978-0-19-539525-9.
- Plundered Nations?: Successes and Failures in Natural Resource Extraction co-edited with Anthony J. Venables, Palgrave Macmillan UK, 2011 ISBN 978-0-230-29022-8.
- Exodus: How Migration is Changing Our World, Oxford University Press, October 2013 ISBN 978-0195398656.
- Refuge: Rethinking Refugee Policy in a Changing World with Alexander Betts, Oxford University Press, September 2017 ISBN 978-0190659158.
- The Future of Capitalism: Facing the New Anxieties, Allen Lane, April 2018 ISBN 978-0241333884.
- Greed Is Dead: Politics After Individualism with John Kay, Allen Lane, July 2020 ISBN 978-0-241-46795-4
- Left Behind: A New Economics for Neglected Places, Allen Lane, June 2024 ISBN 9780241279168.

=== Selected articles ===
- (with Anke Hoeffler) 'On economic causes of civil war' Oxford Economic Papers, vol 50 issue 4, 1998, pp. 563–573.
- (with V. L. Elliott, Håvard Hegre, Anke Hoeffler, Marta Reynal-Querol, Nicholas Sambanis) 'Breaking the Conflict Trap: Civil War and Development Policy' "World Bank Policy Research Report," 2003.
- (with Anke Hoeffler) 'Greed and grievance in civil war' Oxford Economic Papers, vol 56 issue 4, 2004, pp. 563–595.
- (with Lisa Chauvet and Haavard Hegre) 'The Security Challenge in Conflict-Prone Countries', Copenhagen Consensus 2008 Challenge Paper, 2008.

=== Video ===
- The Royal Economic Society's 2006 Annual Public Lecture, by Collier at the (Royal Economic Society)
- Interview with Fareed Zakaria on Foreign Exchange
- TED Conference, Paul Collier on "The Bottom Billion"
- TED Conference, Paul Collier's new rules for rebuilding a broken nation
- Why social science should integrate culture and how to do it?, at the Blavatnik School of Government, Oxford University, January 2017
- Rethinking Development with Sir Paul Collier | Oxford Society for International Development, February 2025

=== Reviews ===
- Harvey, Fiona (21 June 2010). "The Plundered Planet by Paul Collier". Financial Times (Online ed.).
- "How the bottom billion are trapped". Financial Times (Online ed.).
- Ferguson, Niall (1 July 2007). "The Least Among Us". New York Times (Online ed.). ISSN 1553-8095.
- Grove, Samuel (15 August 2008). "The Bottom of the Barrel". MR Online. Monthly Review Foundation.

== See also ==
- Environmental politics
