= Patrick M. Regan =

American political scientist

- Born: September 1, 1956 (age 70); Dearborn, Michigan, U.S.
- Education: Western Michigan University (B.S.); New York University (M.A.); University of Michigan (Ph.D.); Stanford University - Hoover Institution
- Known for: The Institutions and Elections Project
- Awards: Fulbright Scholar
- Scientific career
- Fields: International Relations; Conflict Management
- Workplaces: Binghamton University

Patrick M. Regan (born September 1, 1956) is a professor of Political Science and Peace Studies at University of Notre Dame. His research focuses on International Relations and Conflict Management.

== Biography ==
Regan was born in Dearborn, Michigan and is one of five children born to Michael and Suzanne Regan. Regan attended Western Michigan University for his Bachelor's Degree, New York University for his Master's Degree and University of Michigan for his phD. He was also a member of the Peace Corps after receiving his undergraduate degree and travelled to Calcutta to work with Mother Teresa for six weeks.

Regan married Margaret Mitzel in June 1988 in Bloomfield Hills, Michigan. Their son, Shane, was born in Detroit, Michigan in 1991 and their daughter, Kaitlin, was born in Christchurch, New Zealand in 1994.

Regan's research interests include issues around violent armed conflict and its resolution. This includes the militarization of societies, determinants of human rights violations, negotiations in international conflict resolution, and interventions in civil wars.

Regan has traveled the world extensively. His research has brought him to several conflict-ravaged including Palestine and Central America. His research has been funded by the National Science Foundation and the World Bank. He is on the editorial boards of International Studies Quarterly and is an associate editor of the Journal of Peace Research.

== Teaching Positions ==
Patrick M. Regan taught at Binghamton University 1997-2013 and is currently a faculty member at the University of Notre Dame. He has also held positions at the University of Canterbury in New Zealand and Boğaziçi University in Istanbul, Turkey. From 2004 to 2005, he also served as a Fulbright Scholar at the International Peace Research Institute, Oslo in Oslo, Norway.

== Published works ==
Patrick M. Regan has published articles in The Journal of Politics, Journal of Conflict Resolution, International Studies Quarterly, and the Journal of Peace Research, among others.

He is also the author of several books, including:

- Organizing Societies for War (1994)
- Civil Wars and Foreign Powers (2000)
- Sixteen Million One (2009)
- The Politics of Global Climate Change (2014)
