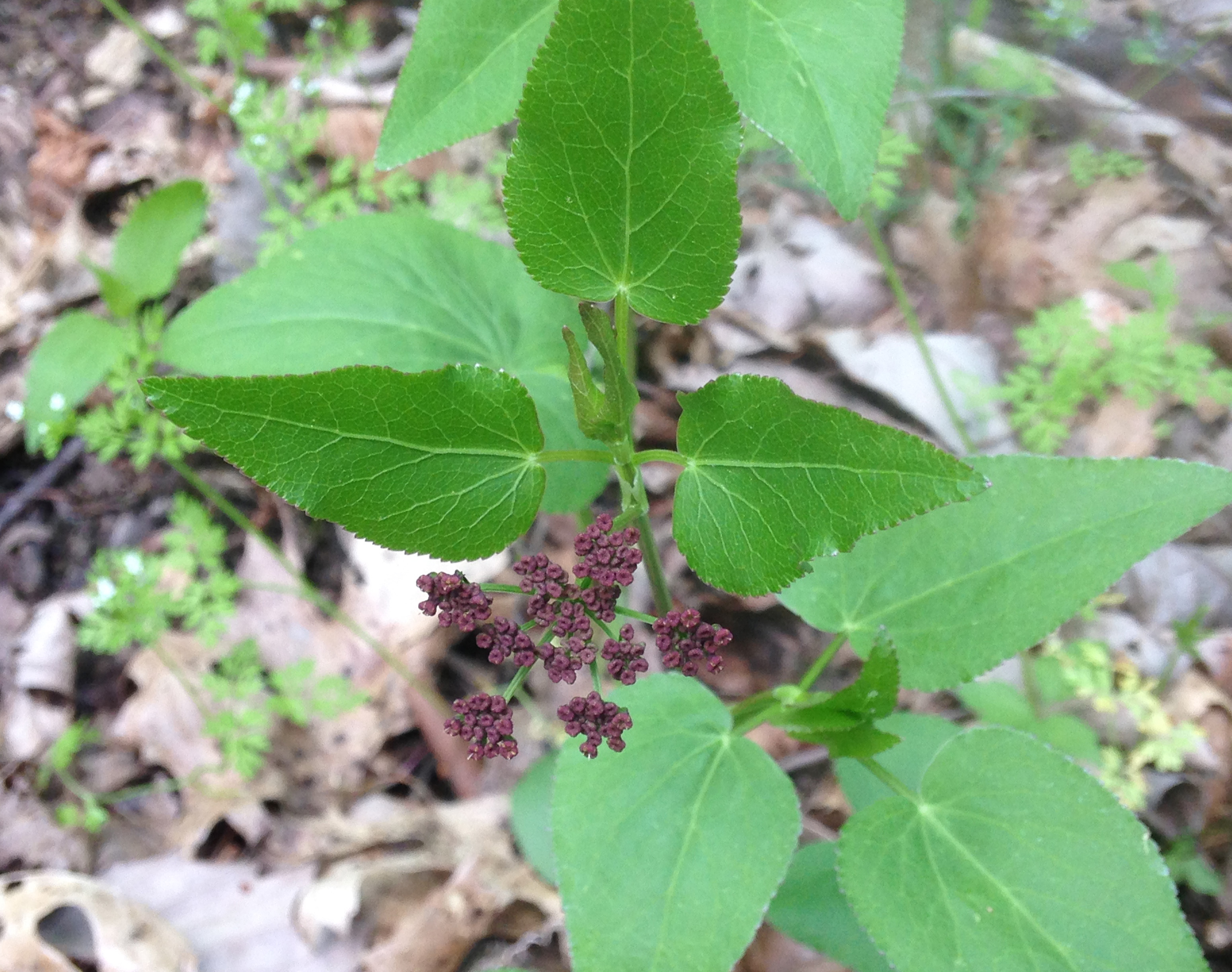

Conservation status
- Secure (NatureServe)

Scientific classification
- Kingdom: Plantae
- Clade: Tracheophytes
- Clade: Angiosperms
- Clade: Eudicots
- Clade: Asterids
- Order: Apiales
- Family: Apiaceae
- Genus: Thaspium
- Species: T. trifoliatum

Binomial name
- Thaspium trifoliatum (L.) A.Gray

= Thaspium trifoliatum =

Species of plant

Thaspium trifoliatum, commonly called meadow-parsnip or purple meadow-parsnip is a species of flowering plant in the carrot family (Apiaceae). It is native to eastern North America where it is found in many eastern U.S. states (excluding the region of New England) and in Ontario, Canada. It has a broad natural habitat, which includes mesic to dry forests and woodlands, prairies, bluffs, and rock outcrops.

== Description ==
Thaspium trifoliatum is an herbaceous perennial growing 30–91 cm (1–3 ft) tall. It has a few basal leaves that are about 3–10 cm (1–4 in) across and heart-shaped. Stem leaves are alternate and trifoliate, with 3 lanceolate to ovate-lanceolate leaflets measuring 3–5 cm (1–2 in) long. The leaflets are finely serrate with a notably white-translucent margin.

The inflorescence is a compound, flat umbel with very small flowers at the end of the upper stems. The flower at the center of the umbel is slightly higher than the others. Each umbel is 3–8 cm (1–3 in) across. The flowers are golden yellow or dark maroon, produced in mid to late spring (ranging from April–June regionally).

The yellow-flowered variety of Thaspium trifoliatum bears a striking resemblance to Zizia aptera, with which it is frequently misidentified when not in fruit. Thaspium trifoliatum can be distinguished by its glabrous stem internodes (as opposed to minutely puberulent), and pedicelled central umbellet flower (as opposed to sessile). Maroon-flowered populations are more easily recognized as Zizia aptera is strictly yellow.

== Taxonomy ==
Two varieties have often been recognized. However, some botanists have expressed uncertainty on which characters should be used to distinguish them, or even if they should be taxonomically recognized at all. The most widely used differentiation is based on solely flower color:

- Thaspium trifoliatum var. aureum Flowers yellow. Widespread throughout much of eastern North America.
- Thaspium trifoliatum var. trifoliatum Flowers maroon. Found primarily from the Appalachian Mountains eastward, with disjunct populations westward in the Ozark Mountains.

== Ecology ==
T. trifoliatum is a food source for caterpillars of the black swallowtail (Papilio polyxenes) and Ozark swallowtail (Papilio joanae) butterflies.
