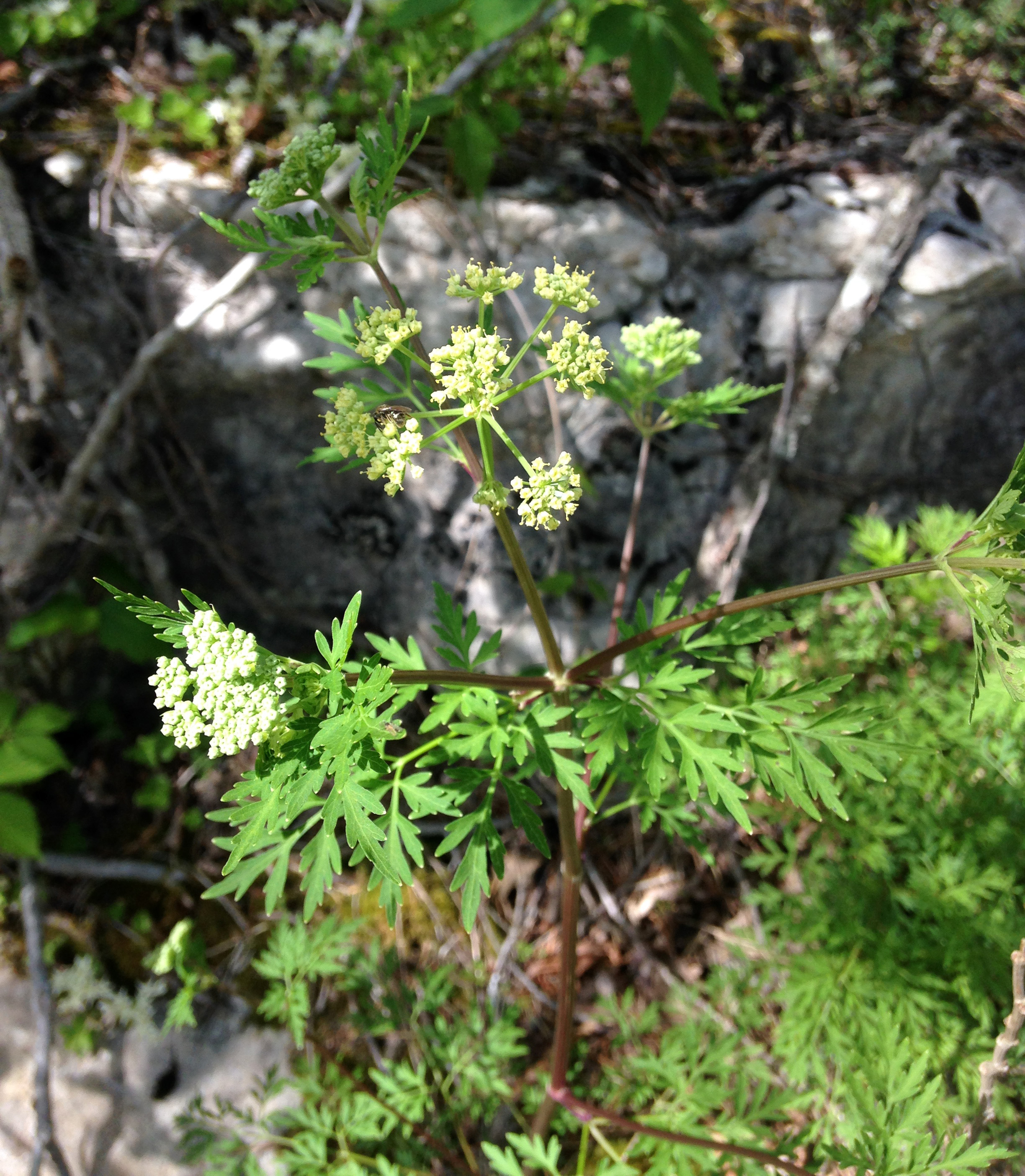

Conservation status
- Imperiled (NatureServe)

Scientific classification
- Kingdom: Plantae
- Clade: Tracheophytes
- Clade: Angiosperms
- Clade: Eudicots
- Clade: Asterids
- Order: Apiales
- Family: Apiaceae
- Genus: Thaspium
- Species: T. pinnatifidum

Binomial name
- Thaspium pinnatifidum (Buckley) A.Gray

= Thaspium pinnatifidum =

Species of flowering plant

Thaspium pinnatifidum, commonly called cutleaf meadow-parsnip, is a species of flowering plant in the carrot family (Apiaceae). It is native to eastern North America where it is found in the southern Appalachian Mountains, being found in parts of Georgia, Kentucky, North Carolina, and Tennessee. Within these states it has a sporadic and limited range

Its natural habitat is in dry to mesic forest openings over calcareous rock.

This species is considered imperiled due to habitat loss via canopy closure, invasive species, and destructive roadside maintenance within its naturally narrow geographic range.

== Description ==
Thaspium pinnatifidum is an herbaceous biennial or perennial growing to about three feet high. Its leaflets are deeply dissected with many narrow divisions. It produces umbels of cream-colored flowers in late spring and early summer.

It has often been confused with narrow-leaved forms of Thaspium chapmanii, which has led to over-mapping of its true range.
