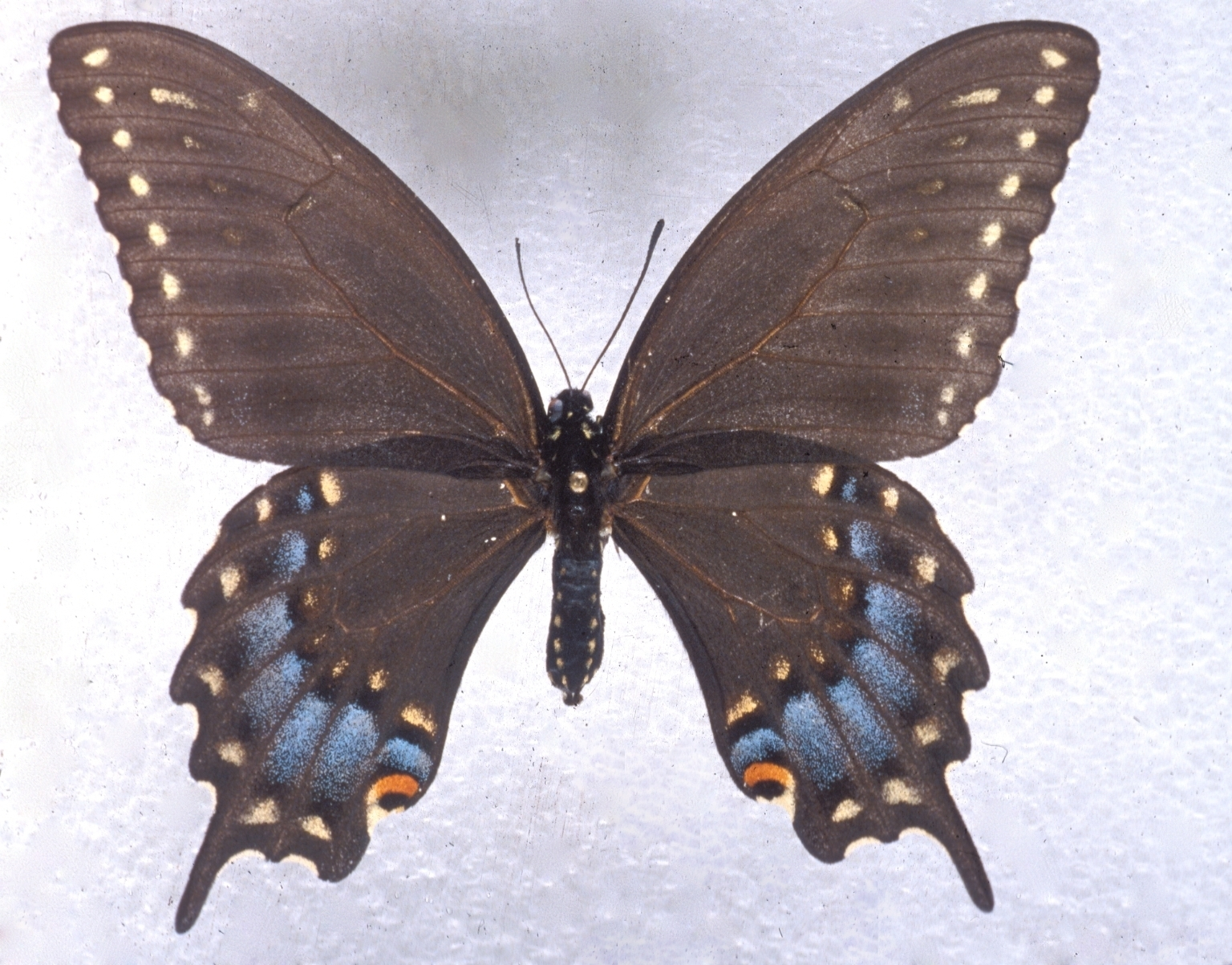
- Female
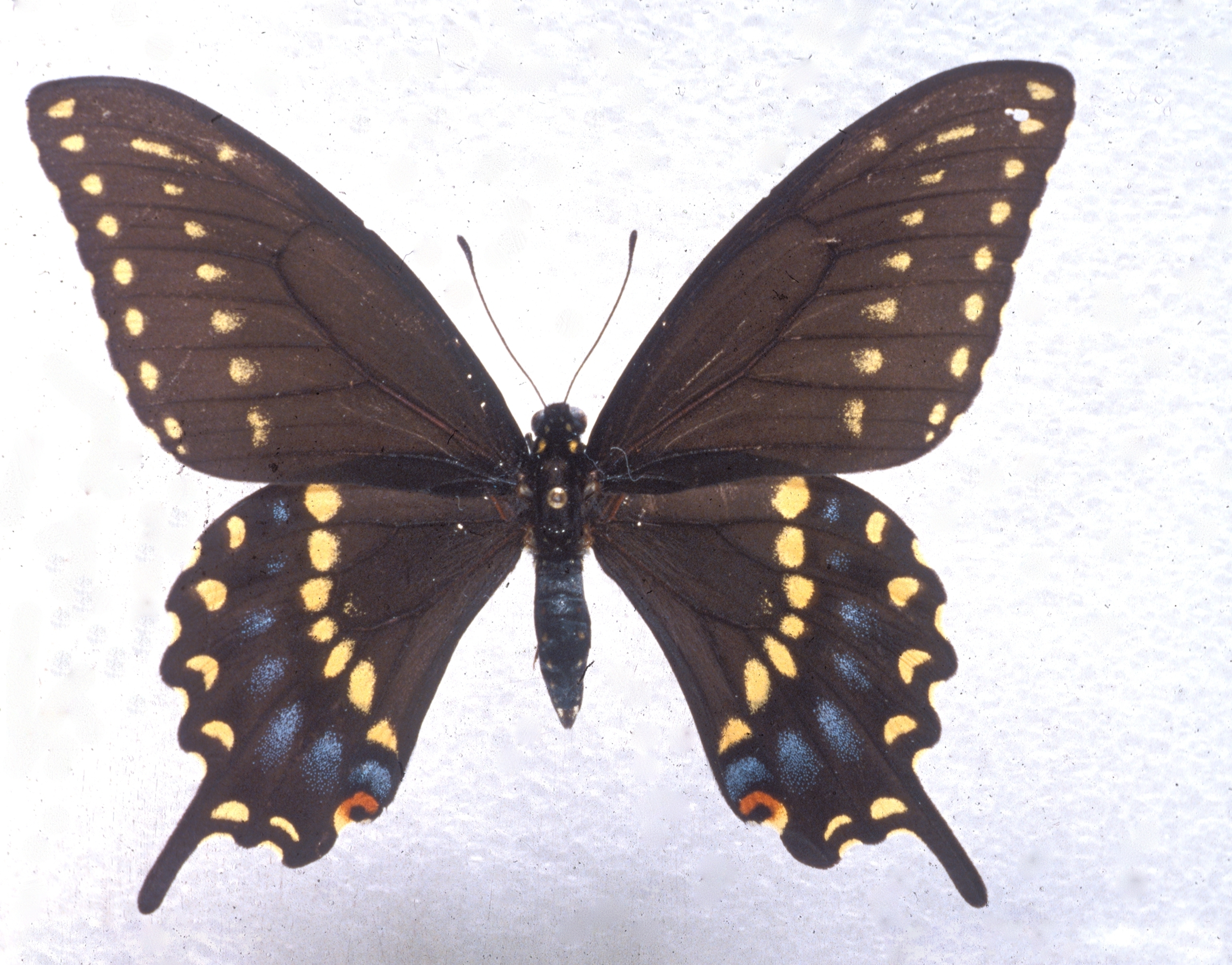
- Male

Conservation status
- Imperiled (NatureServe)

Scientific classification
- Kingdom: Animalia
- Phylum: Arthropoda
- Clade: Pancrustacea
- Class: Insecta
- Order: Lepidoptera
- Family: Papilionidae
- Genus: Papilio
- Species: P. joanae

Binomial name
- Papilio joanae J. Heitzman, 1973

= Papilio joanae =

Species of butterfly

Papilio joanae, the Ozark swallowtail, is a North American butterfly species in the family Papilionidae. It was once considered a synonym of the black swallowtail (Papilio polyxenes).

== Description ==
The Ozark swallowtail is almost identical to the black swallowtail. Despite this similarity, an analysis of the Ozark swallowtail's mitochondrial DNA suggests that it is actually more closely related to the Old World swallowtail (Papilio machaon). On both surfaces of the hindwing, the pupil in the eyespot usually touches the edge of the inner margin. On the underside of the hindwing, the orange spots have very little or no yellow in them. The black adult color pattern characterizing P. polyxenes is presumed to be inherited as a simple autosomal dominant

== Distribution ==
This butterfly is endemic to the Ozark Mountains in the United States. It is uncommon to rare in this region.

== Flight ==
The Ozark swallowtail is seen from April to September.

== Habitat ==
P. joanae is found in cedar glades and woodland habitats.

== Life cycle ==
The caterpillar is morphologically very similar to the black swallowtail caterpillar. The two species may be more easily distinguished by the habitat and host plants upon which the caterpillar feeds, as these differ. There are two broods per year.

== Host plants ==
- Thaspium barbinode - meadow parsnip
- Taenidia integerrima - yellow pimpernel
- Zizia aurea - golden alexander
