= Yellow pimpernel =

Yellow pimpernel is a common name for several plants and may refer to:

- Lysimachia nemorum
- Taenidia integerrima, native to eastern North America
