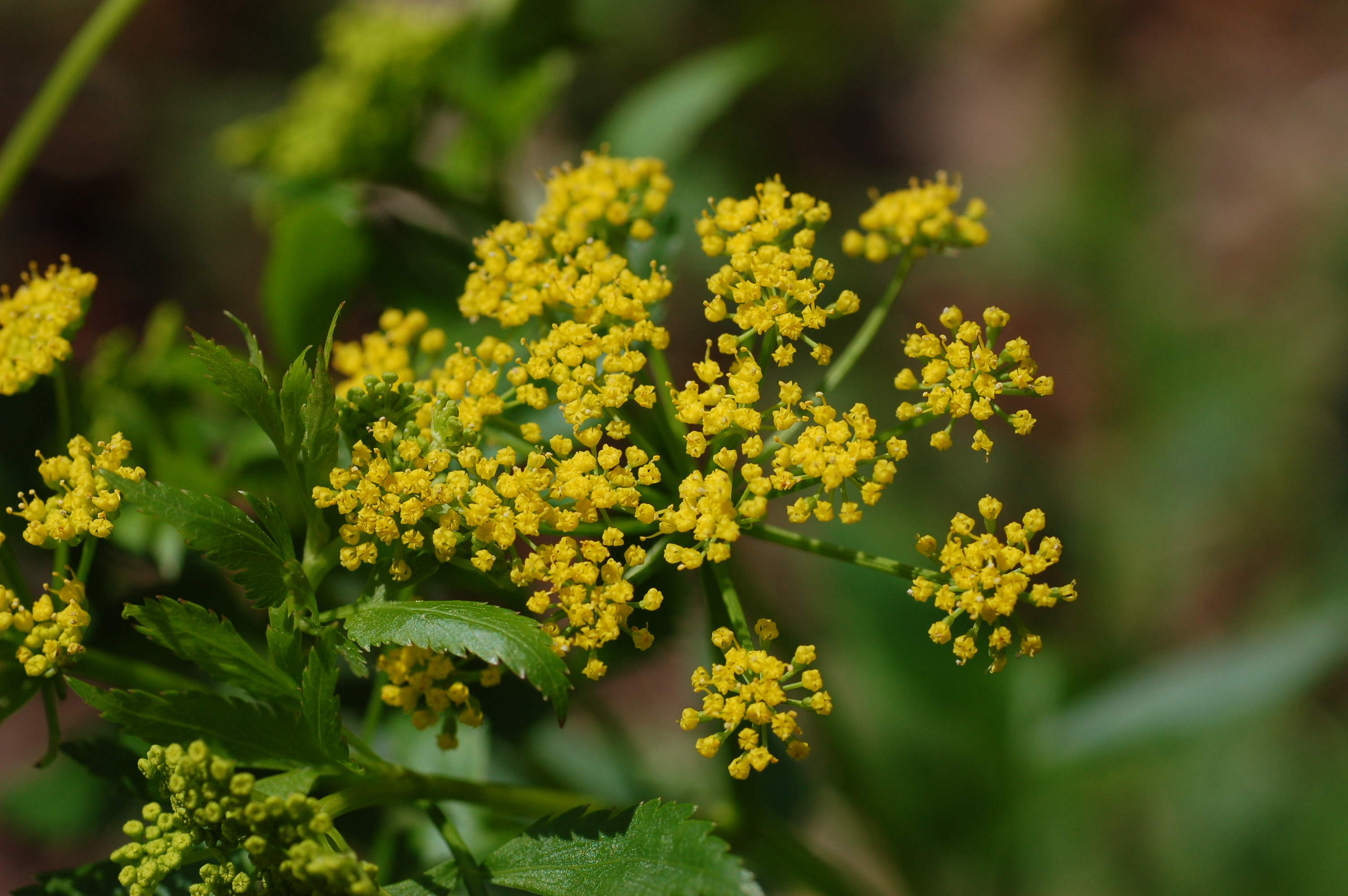

Conservation status
- Secure (NatureServe)

Scientific classification
- Kingdom: Plantae
- Clade: Tracheophytes
- Clade: Angiosperms
- Clade: Eudicots
- Clade: Asterids
- Order: Apiales
- Family: Apiaceae
- Genus: Zizia
- Species: Z. aurea

Binomial name
- Zizia aurea (L.) W.D.J. Koch

Synonyms
- Smyrnium aureum L.; Zizia aurea f. obtusifolia (Bissell) Fernald; Zizia aurea var. obtusifolia Bissell

= Zizia aurea =

Species of flowering plant

Zizia aurea (golden alexanders, golden zizia) is a flowering herbaceous perennial plant of the carrot family Apiaceae. It is native to eastern Canada and the United States, from the eastern Great Plains to the Atlantic Coast. The genus is named for Johann Baptist Ziz, a German botanist. The common name is based on the similarity to alexanders (Smyrnium olusatrum), another member of the carrot family from coastal areas in Europe and Northern Africa.

== Description ==
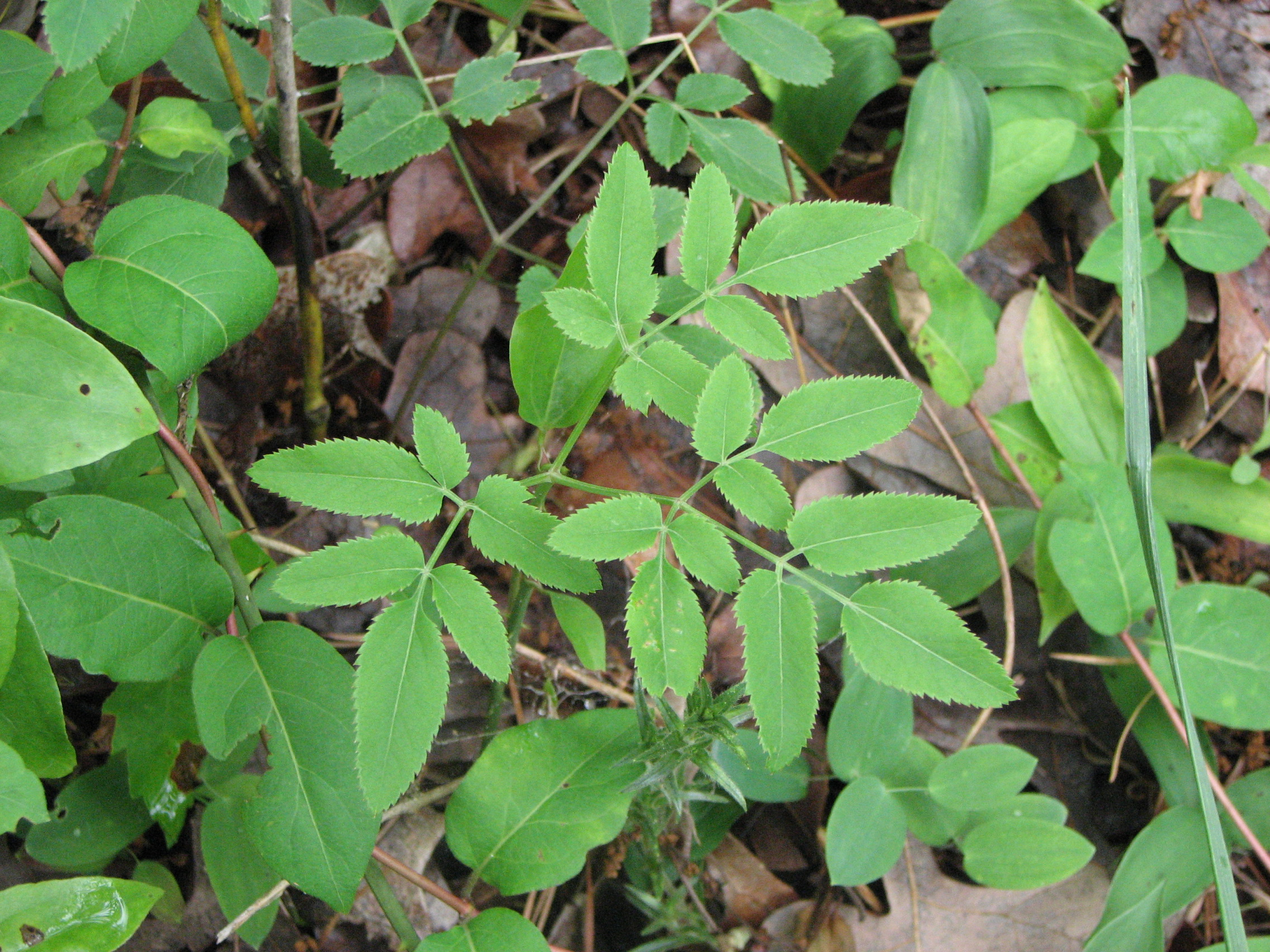
Leaves

Zizia aurea grows to 40 to 75 centimetres (16 to 30 in) tall but can sometimes grow taller. The leaves are 8 cm (3 1/4 in) long and 5 cm (2 in) wide. They are attached to the stems alternately. Each leaf is compound and odd-pinnate, with leaflets that are normally lanceolate or ovate with serrated edges. The root system consists of a dense cluster of coarse fibrous roots.

It blooms from May to June. Its flowers are yellow and grow in a flat-topped umbel at the top of the plant. Each flower is only 3 mm (0.12 in) long and has five sepals, five petals, and five stamens. Each flower produces a single 3 to 4 mm (0.12 to 0.16 in) long, oblong fruit (schizocarp) containing two seeds. In the fall both the leaves and the fruit turn purple.

== Distribution and habitat ==
Golden alexander is native to the United States and Canada. It grows from New Brunswick to Saskatchewan, south to Florida and Texas, and west to Montana. It is found in a broad variety of habitats, such as moist black soil prairies, openings in moist to mesic woodlands, savannas, thickets, limestone glades and bluffs, power line clearings in woodland areas, abandoned fields, and wet meadows. It can tolerate dry summers even though it prefers wet habitats. It is hardy in USDA zones 4–9.

== Ecology ==
It is a host plant for the caterpillars of the black swallowtail (Papilio polyxenes asterius) and Ozark swallowtail (Papilio joanae) butterflies. Females of the mining bee species Andrena ziziae are oligolectic on Zizia aurea—they eat only its pollen. Dozens of species of bees, flies, wasps, butterflies, and other insects visit the flowers of Zizia aurea for its nectar.

== Use in traditional medicine ==
Native Americans in the United States and Canada put the plant to a variety of medicinal uses: the leaves and flowers were used to prepare a tea believed to be beneficial in the treatment of disorders of the female reproductive system, while the root, believed to possess hemostatic and hypnotic properties, was also crushed and used to treat sharp pains, used to prepare poultices for the treatment of inflammations and sores and infused to brew a tea considered to have febrifugal virtues.

== Culinary uses ==
The raw flowers (trimmed of any tougher stems) are sometimes added to green salads, while the young inflorescences are eaten whole after blanching in the same way as that used to cook broccoli.

== Phototoxicity ==
Care should be taken to thoroughly wash skin exposed to the sap of broken plant tissues, as subsequent exposure to the UV in sunlight may cause burns and blistering - as in the case of several species of the related Apiaceous genus Heracleum - notably H. mantegazzianum, the giant hogweed. The principal compound present in Z. aurea responsible for the phototoxicity of this species is the furanocoumarin xanthotoxin, a.k.a. methoxsalen, which has also been isolated from a number of other species belonging to the family Apiaceae - notably Ammi majus.
