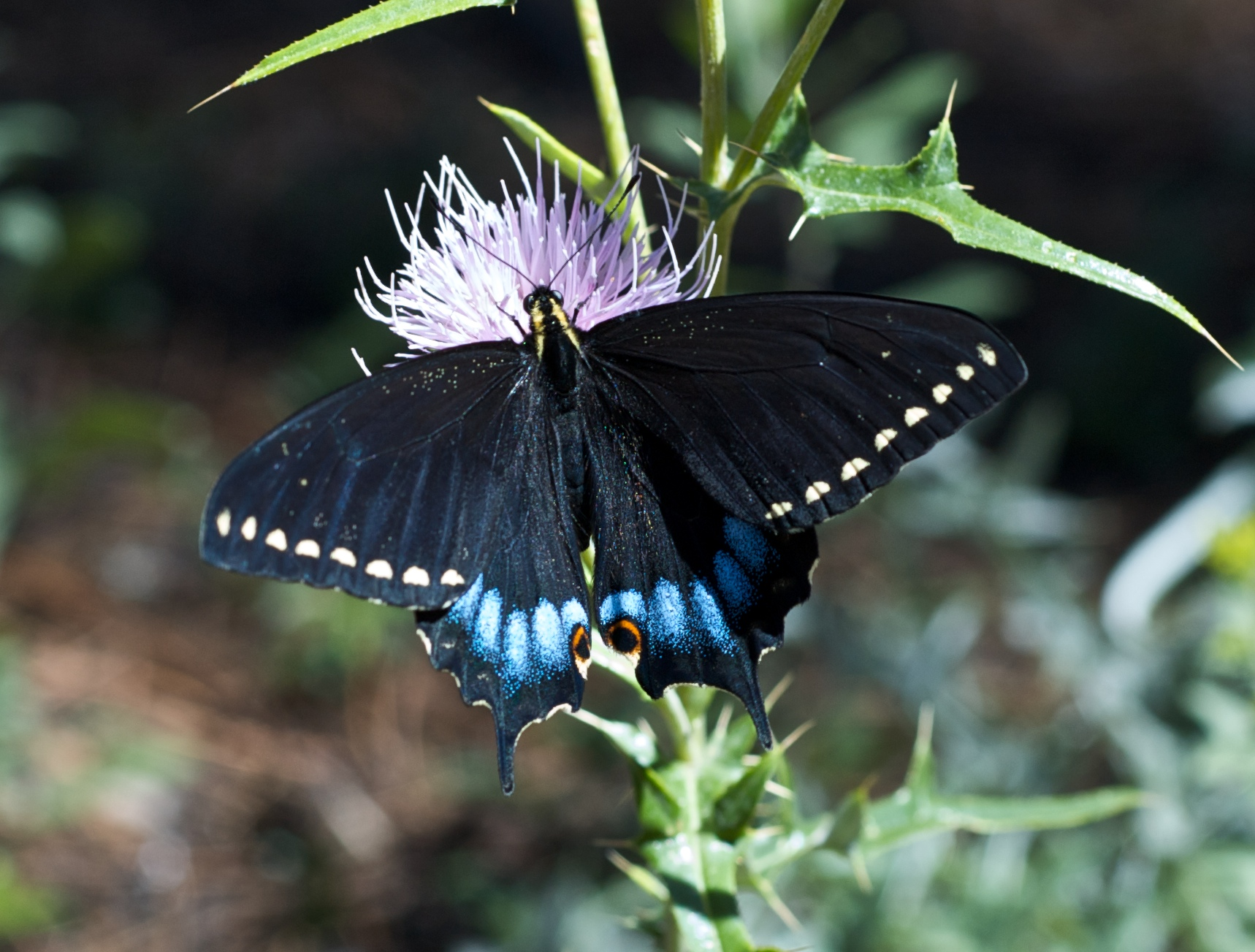
- Grand Canyon swallowtail (P. i. kaibabensis) female

Conservation status
- Apparently Secure (NatureServe)

Scientific classification
- Kingdom: Animalia
- Phylum: Arthropoda
- Clade: Pancrustacea
- Class: Insecta
- Order: Lepidoptera
- Family: Papilionidae
- Genus: Papilio
- Species: P. indra

Binomial name
- Papilio indra Reakirt, 1866

= Papilio indra =

Species of butterfly

Papilio indra, the Indra swallowtail, short-tailed black swallowtail, or cliff swallowtail, is a western North American butterfly in the family Papilionidae.

== Description ==
The Indra swallowtail is a black butterfly with minimal blue and whitish markings, similar in coloration to the black swallowtail or the short-tailed swallowtail. Likewise, the species has a very short tail, and dark blue crescents on the topside of the hindwing.

== Habitat and distribution ==
P. indra can be found in a variety of ecosystems, ranging from sea level in some areas to several thousand feet in elevation elsewhere. They can be found near many cities and other human settlements, as well as in extremely isolated, pristine forested regions, remote high deserts, prairies, or in montane habitats.

Geographically, P. indra is found in the western half of North America, from extreme southern British Columbia, south through Washington, Oregon and California (extending to northern Baja California, Mexico). It is also found around the Rockies, north from Idaho and western Montana through Wyoming, Nevada, Utah and Colorado, and south to Arizona and New Mexico. Sightings have also occurred as far east as western Nebraska and South Dakota.

== Flight ==
The Indra swallowtail has one brood per year and is on the wing in spring in southern or lower altitudes but early summer in northern or higher altitudes.

== Subspecies ==
There is an (as-yet) unnamed subspecies that has been referred to as P. i. bonnevillensis by some, and as the "Utah-West Desert segregate" by others.

Currently recognized subspecies are:

- P. i. calcicola Emmel & Griffin, 1998
- P. i. fordi Comstock & Martin, 1956
- P. i. indra Reakirt, 1866
- P. i. kaibabensis Bauer, 1955
- P. i. martini T. & J. Emmel, 1966
- P. i. minori Cross, 1936
- P. i. nevadensis T. & J. Emmel, 1971
- P. i. panamintensis Emmel, 1982
- P. i. pygmaeus J. Emmel, T. Emmel & Griffin, 1998
- P. i. pergamus H. Edwards, 1874
- P. i. phyllisae J. Emmel, 1982
- P. i. shastensis Emmel & Emmel, 1998

== Food plants ==
Parsley, wild carrot and other Apiaceae (umbelliforme) family species.
