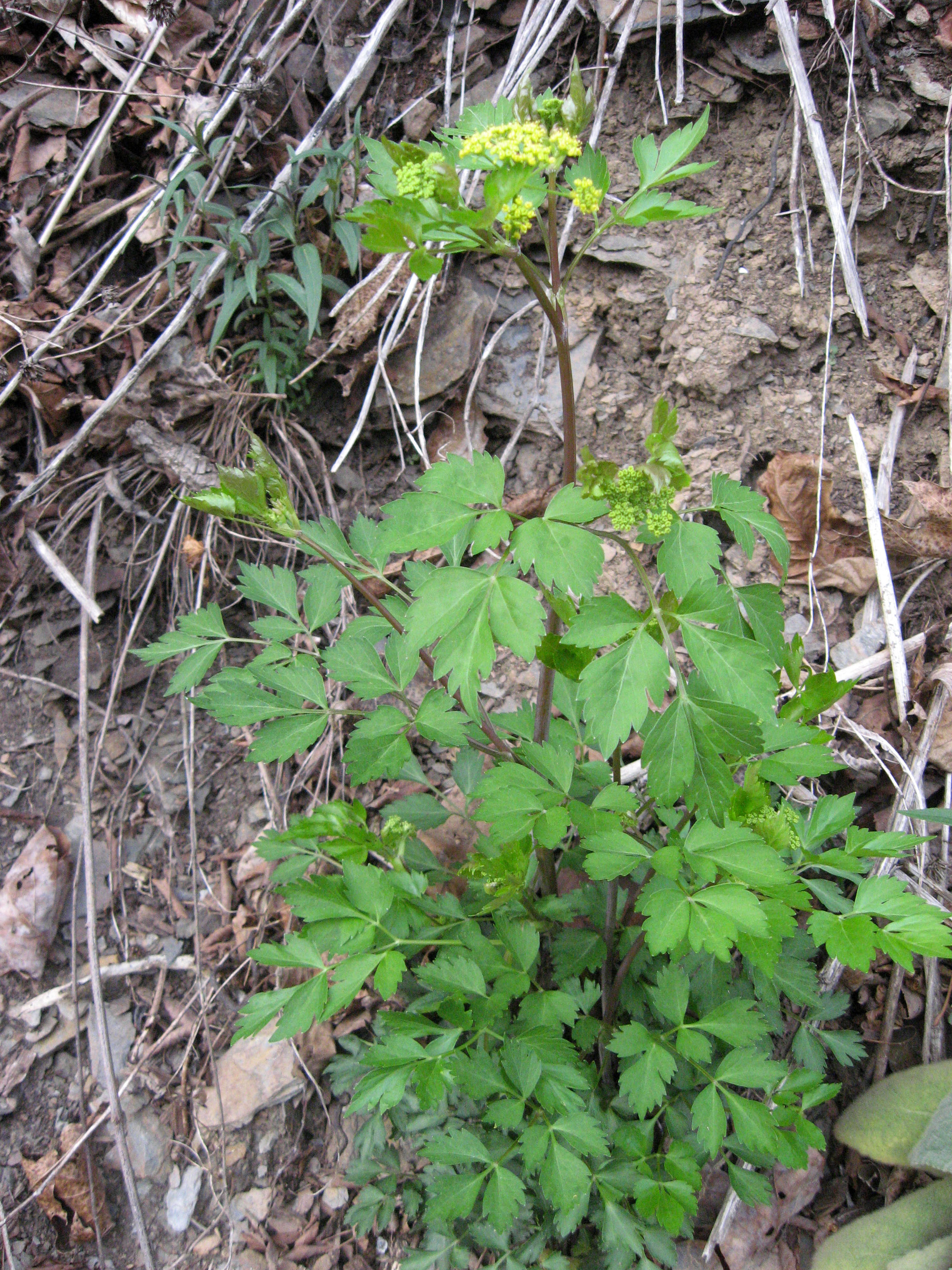
- Thaspium barbinode

Scientific classification
- Kingdom: Plantae
- Clade: Tracheophytes
- Clade: Angiosperms
- Clade: Eudicots
- Clade: Asterids
- Order: Apiales
- Family: Apiaceae
- Subfamily: Apioideae
- Tribe: Selineae
- Genus: Thaspium; Nutt.

Species
- Thaspium barbinode; Thaspium chapmanii; Thaspium pinnatifidum; Thaspium trifoliatum

= Thaspium =

Genus of plants

Thaspium is a genus of flowering plants in the Apiaceae (parsley or carrot family). A common name for the various Thaspium species is meadowparsnip or meadow-parsip. Its native range is eastern North America, from eastern Texas in the southwest to Maine in the northeast.

== Species ==
There are four accepted Thaspium species and one accepted variety:

- Thaspium barbinode (Michx.) Nutt. – hairyjoint meadowparsnip
- Thaspium chapmanii (J.M. Coult. & Rose) Small – hairy meadow-parsnip
- Thaspium pinnatifidum (Buckley) A. Gray – cutleaf meadowparsnip
- Thaspium trifoliatum (L.) A. Gray – purple meadowparsnip

- T. trifoliatum var. aureum (Nutt.) Britton
