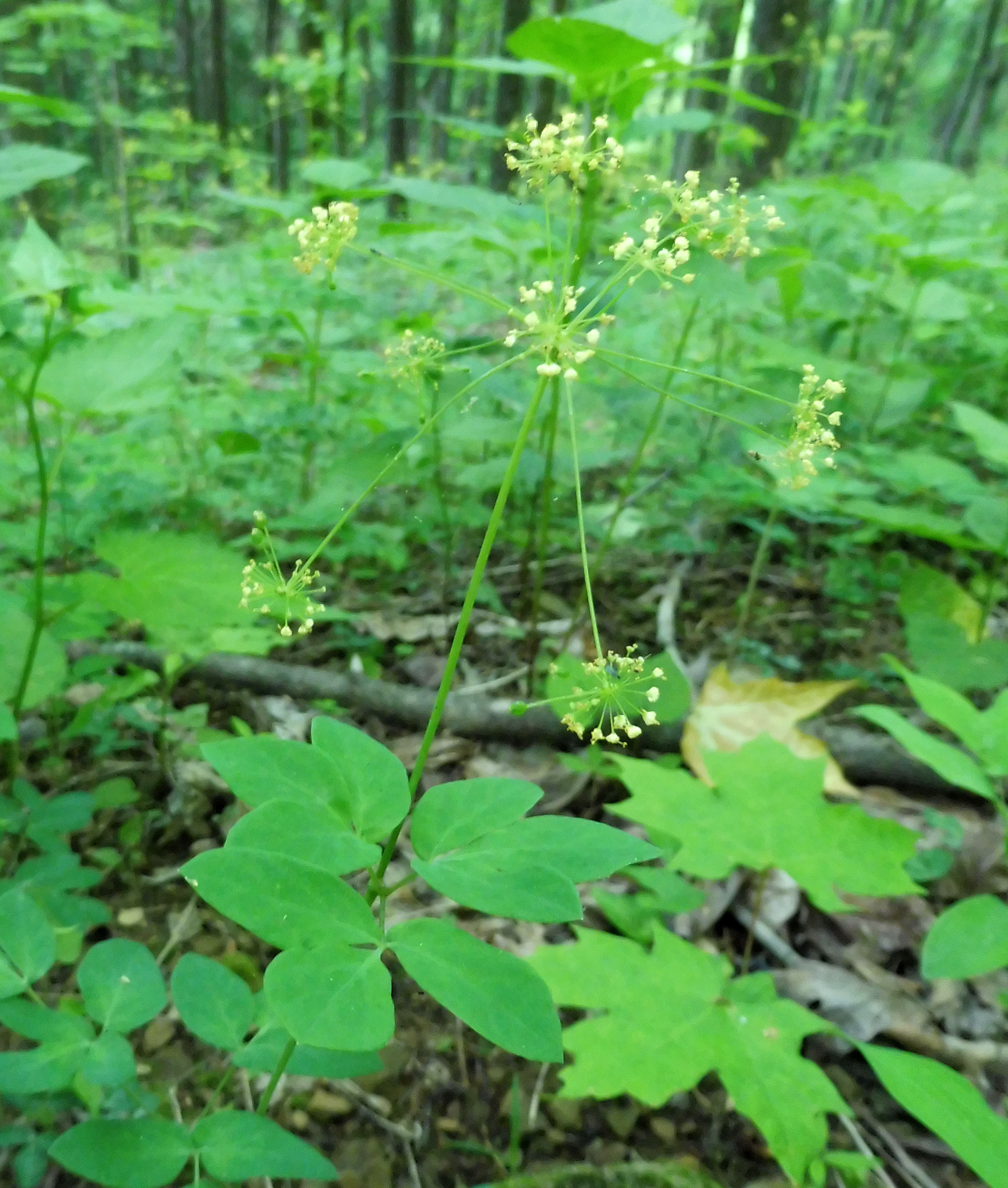
- Taenidia integerrima

Scientific classification
- Kingdom: Plantae
- Clade: Tracheophytes
- Clade: Angiosperms
- Clade: Eudicots
- Clade: Asterids
- Order: Apiales
- Family: Apiaceae
- Subfamily: Apioideae
- Tribe: Selineae
- Genus: Taenidia (Torrey & A.Gray) Drude

Species
- 2, see text.

= Taenidia (plant) =

Genus of flowering plants

Taenidia is a small genus of flowering plants in the carrot family, commonly known as pimpernels. This genus is native only to eastern North America.

This genus consists of somewhat delicate perennials that flower in late spring and early summer.

== Species ==
- Taenidia integerrima - yellow pimpernel; widespread in eastern North America
- Taenidia montana - mountain pimpernel; restricted to the central Appalachian Mountains
