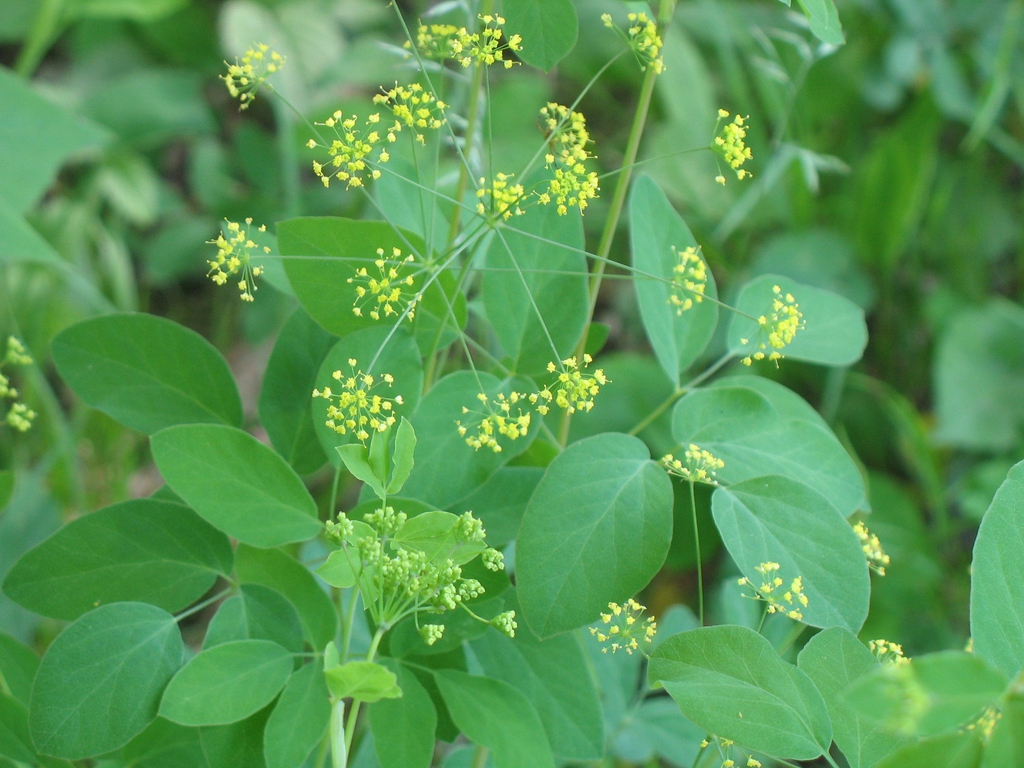

Scientific classification
- Kingdom: Plantae
- Clade: Tracheophytes
- Clade: Angiosperms
- Clade: Eudicots
- Clade: Asterids
- Order: Apiales
- Family: Apiaceae
- Genus: Taenidia
- Species: T. montana

Binomial name
- Taenidia montana (Mack.) Cronquist

= Taenidia montana =

Species of plant

Taenidia montana, the mountain pimpernel, is a herbaceous flowering perennial from the family Apiaceae. It is native to the Eastern United States (Pennsylvania, West Virginia, Virginia, and Maryland).
