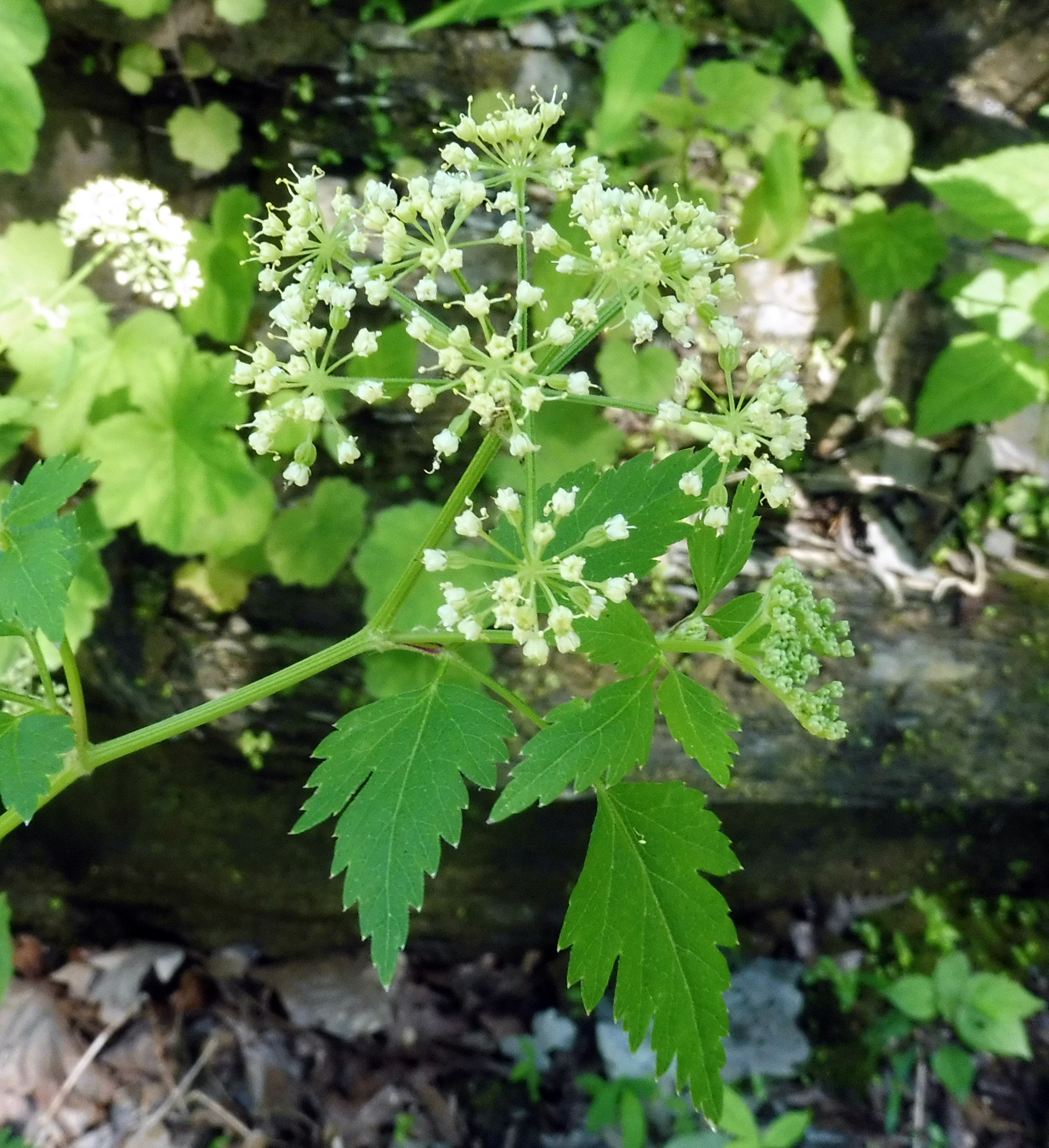

Scientific classification
- Kingdom: Plantae
- Clade: Tracheophytes
- Clade: Angiosperms
- Clade: Eudicots
- Clade: Asterids
- Order: Apiales
- Family: Apiaceae
- Genus: Thaspium
- Species: T. chapmanii

Binomial name
- Thaspium chapmanii (J.M.Coult. & Rose) Small

Synonyms
- T. barbinode var. chapmnaii

= Thaspium chapmanii =

Species of plant

Thaspium chapmaniii, also called the hairy meadowparsnip, is a species of flowering plant in the carrot family (Apiaceae). It is native to eastern North America, where it is widespread in calcareous areas. Its natural habitats are open oak woodlands, savannas, calcareous bluffs, and limestone glades.

It is a tall perennial that produces umbels of white flowers in late spring. It can be distinguished from the similar Thaspium barbinode by its cream-colored flowers, more pubescent and dissected foliage, and taller habit.
