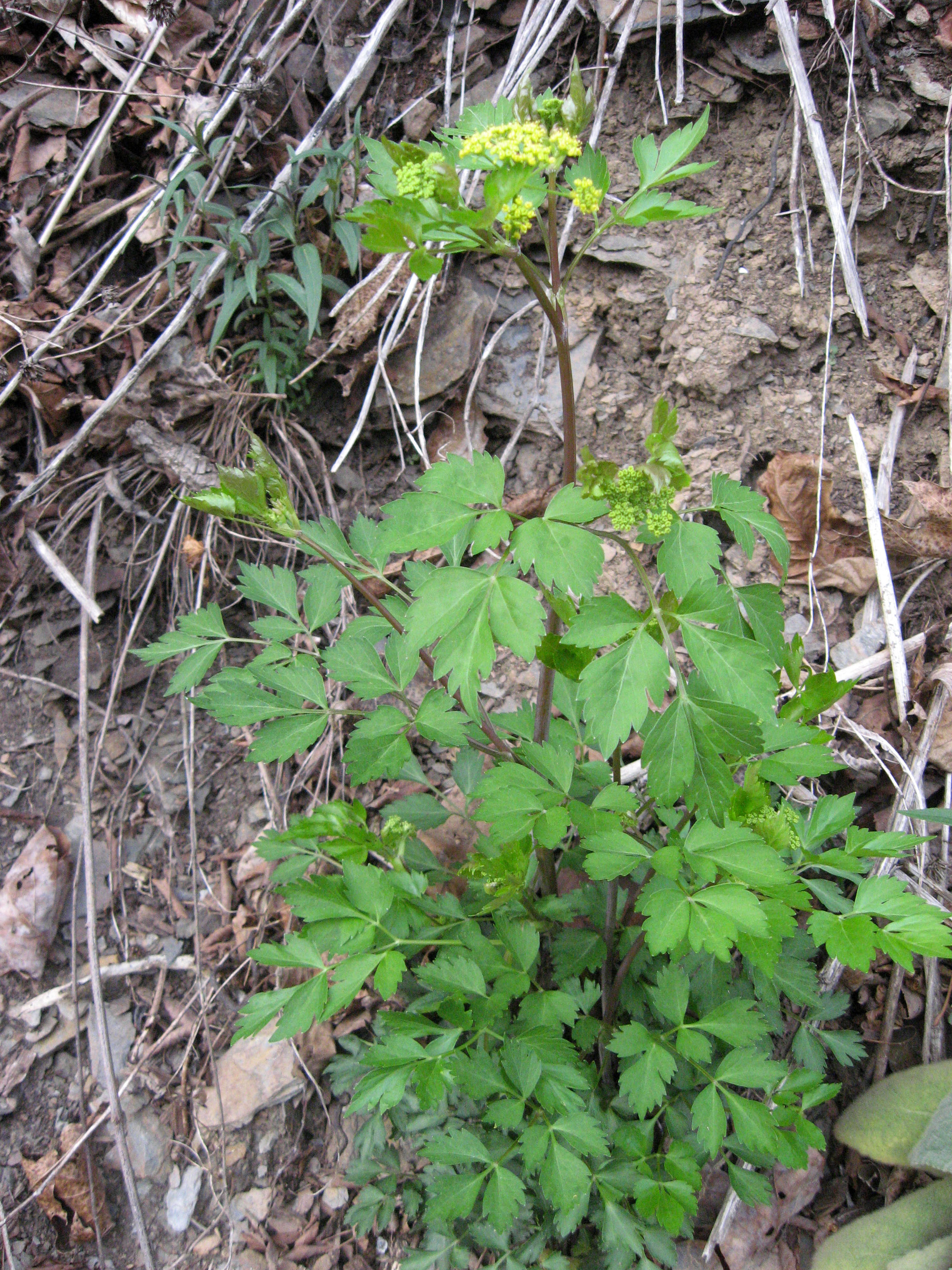

Scientific classification
- Kingdom: Plantae
- Clade: Tracheophytes
- Clade: Angiosperms
- Clade: Eudicots
- Clade: Asterids
- Order: Apiales
- Family: Apiaceae
- Genus: Thaspium
- Species: T. barbinode

Binomial name
- Thaspium barbinode (Michx.) Nutt. (1818)

Synonyms
- Ligusticum barbinode Michx. (1803); Smyrnium barbinode (Michx.) Muhl. ex Pursh (1813)

= Thaspium barbinode =

Bearded meadow-parsnip

Species of plant

Thaspium barbinode, known by the common names of bearded meadow-parsnip and hairy-jointed meadow-parsnip, is a member of the carrot family, Apiaceae. It is a perennial herb, native to the eastern United States, from eastern Texas to southeastern Wisconsin and the Florida panhandle to southern New York. Compared to Thaspium chapmanii, the herb is shorter, and has similar bright yellow flowers.
