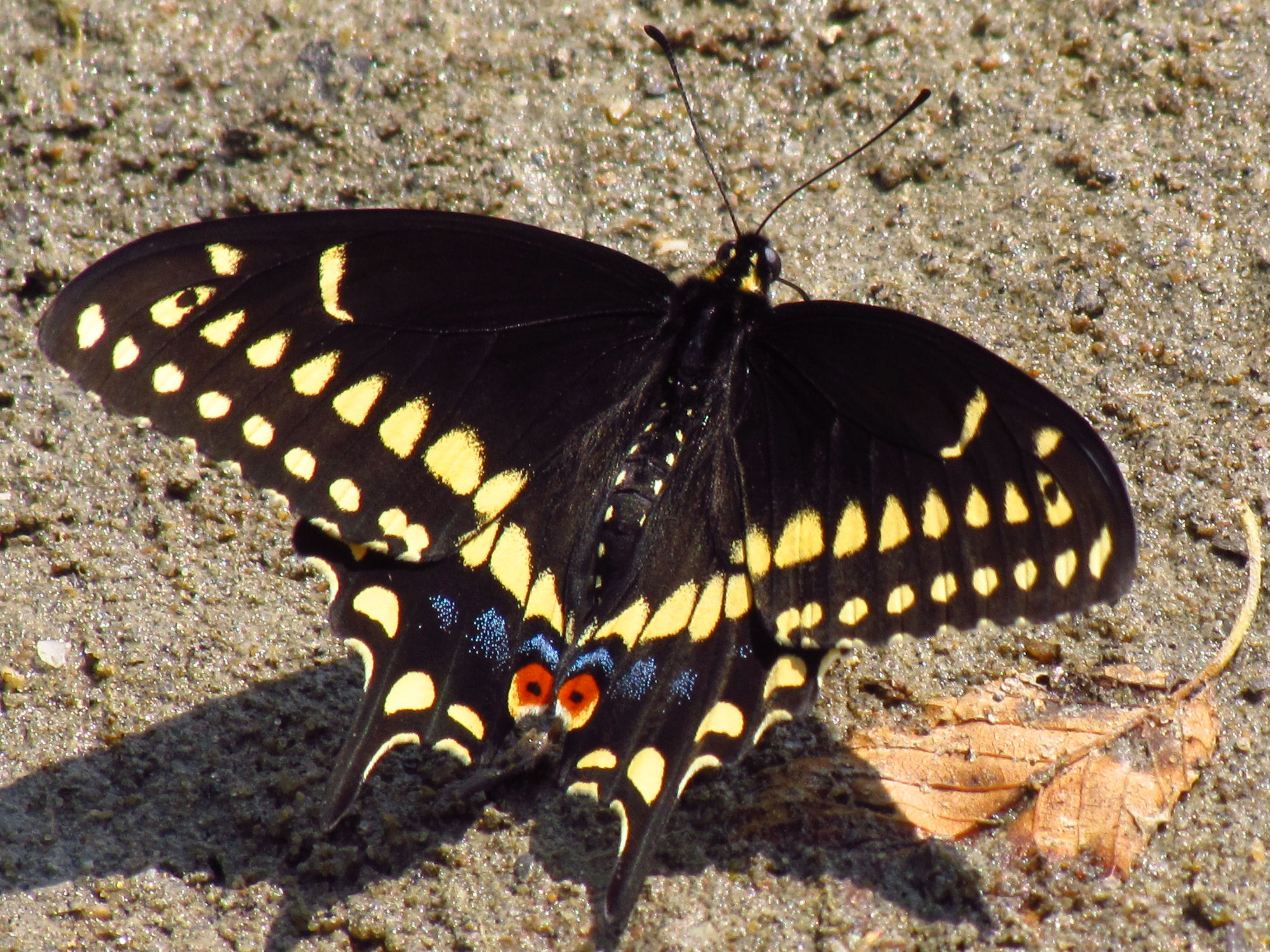
- Male
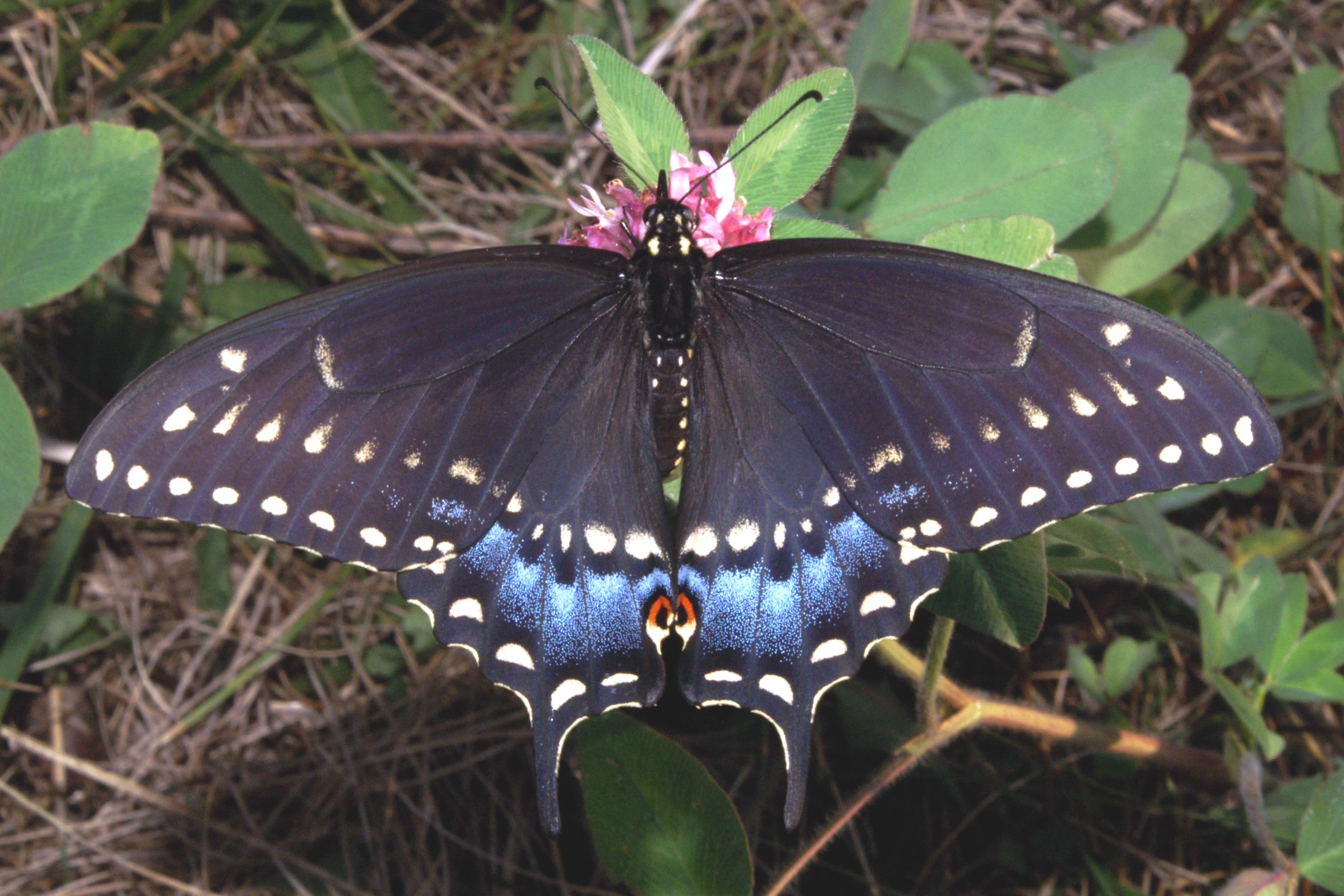
- Female

Conservation status
- Secure (NatureServe)

- Least Concern (IUCN 3.1)

Scientific classification
- Kingdom: Animalia
- Phylum: Arthropoda
- Class: Insecta
- Order: Lepidoptera
- Family: Papilionidae
- Genus: Papilio
- Species: P. polyxenes

Binomial name
- Papilio polyxenes Fabricius, 1775

Subspecies
- P. p. americus Kollar, 1849; P. p. asterius Stoll, 1782; P. p. coloro Wright, 1905; P. p. costarum Orellana-B, 2009; P. p. gerardi Bollino and Vitale, 2002; P. p. kahli Chermock, 1937; P. p. polyxenes Fabricius, 1775; P. p. sadalus H. Lucas, 1892; P. p. stabilis Rothschild and Jordan, 1906

= Papilio polyxenes =

Black swallowtail

Species of insect

Papilio polyxenes, the (eastern) black swallowtail, American swallowtail or parsnip swallowtail, is a butterfly found throughout much of North America. An extremely similar-appearing species, Papilio joanae, occurs in the Ozark Mountains region, but it appears to be closely related to Papilio machaon, rather than P. polyxenes. The species is named after the figure in Greek mythology, Polyxena (pron.: /pəˈlɪksɨnə/; Greek: Πολυξένη), who was the youngest daughter of King Priam of Troy. Its caterpillar is often called the "parsleyworm" because the caterpillar feeds on parsley.

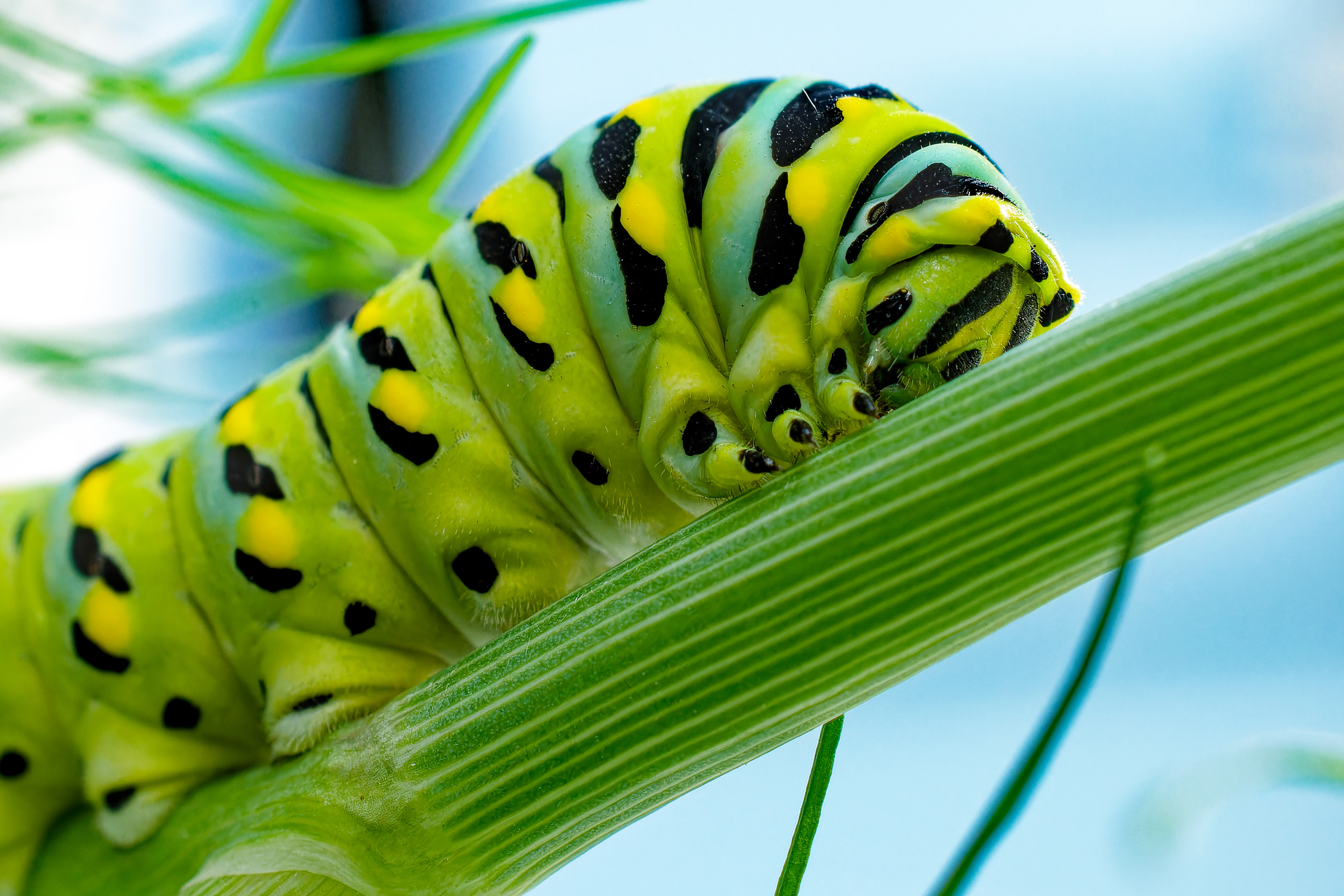
Macro view of the parsleyworm on Anethum graveolens

The Papilio polyxenes demonstrates polyandry and a lek mating system, showing no male parental care and display sites. Females are therefore able to choose males based on these sites and males are the only resource the females find at these sites.

== Taxonomy ==
Papilio polyxenes is part of the tribe Papilionini of the swallowtail butterfly family, Papilionidae. The members of this tribe all have tails on the hindwings, and therefore include species named swallowtail. P. polyxenes is part of the genus Papilio, which is the biggest group of the family Papilionidae. Subspecies polyxenes, once found in Cuba, is now considered likely extinct. Members of this genus typically feed on plants of the family Lauraceae, Rutaceae and Umbelliferae.

== Distribution ==
Papilio polyxenes are found from southern Canada through to South America. In North America they are more common east of the Rocky Mountains. They are usually found in open areas like fields, parks, marshes or deserts, and they prefer tropical or temperate habitats.

== Morphology ==
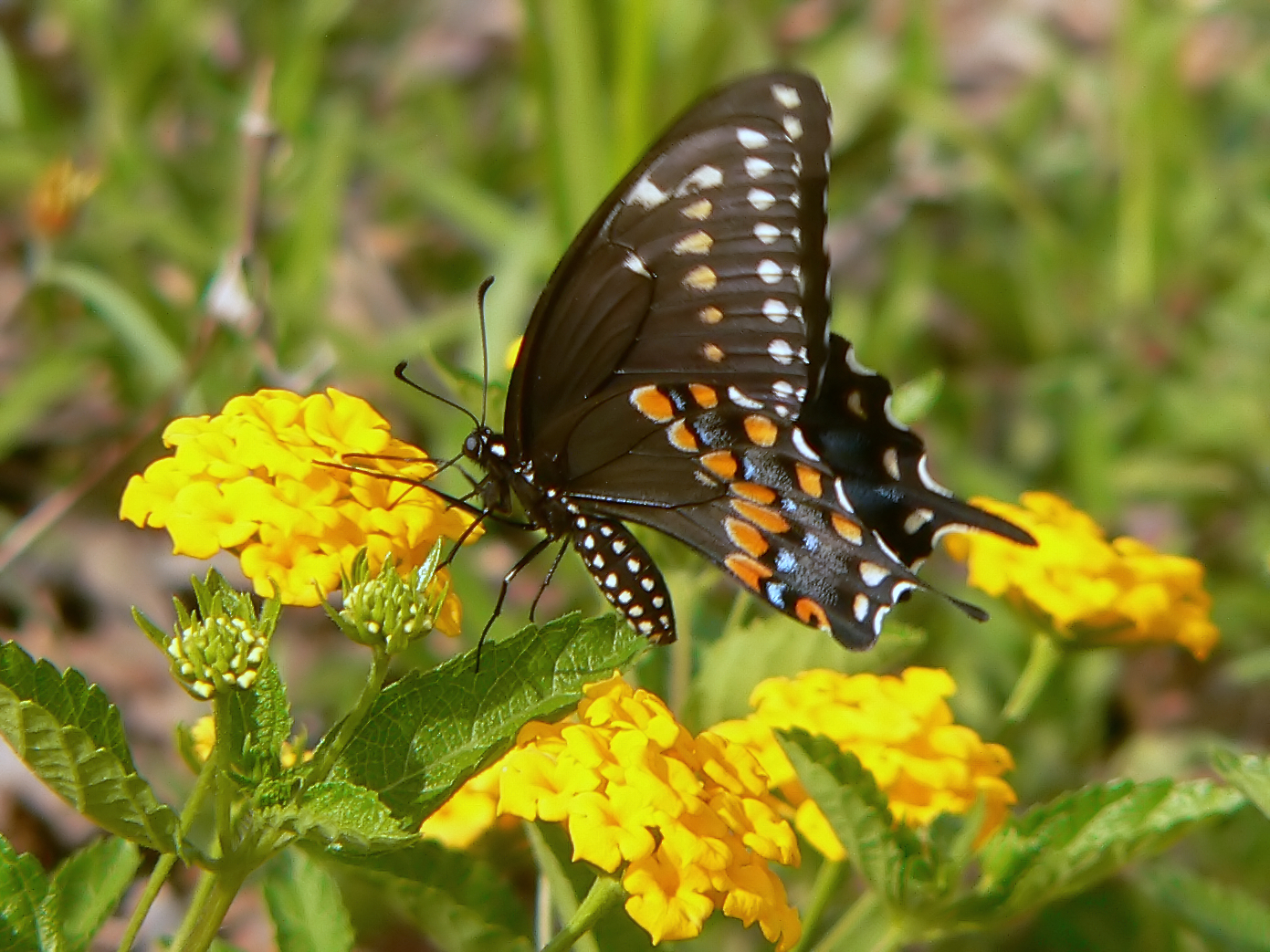
Ventral view - female

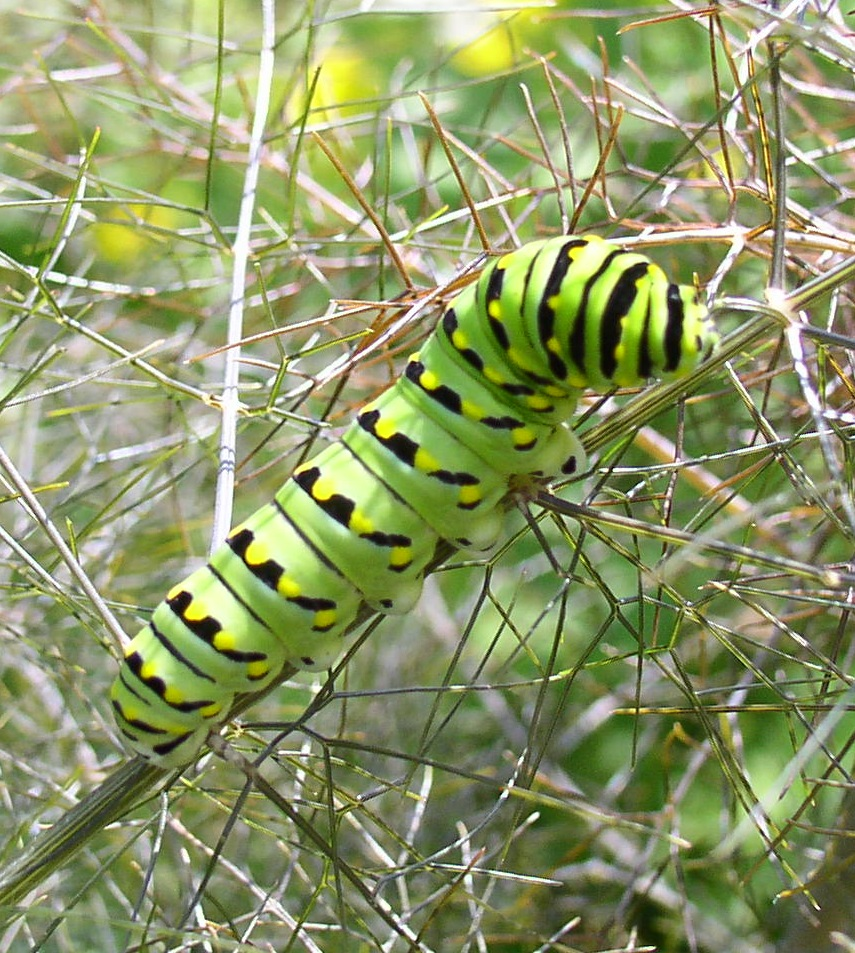
Parsleyworm of Papilio polyxenes on Foeniculum vulgare

=== Eggs and larvae ===
Eggs are pale yellow. Young larvae are mostly black and white with a saddle, and older larvae are green with black transverse bands containing yellow spots.

=== Caterpillar and chrysalis ===
This caterpillar absorbs toxins from the host plants, and therefore tastes poor to bird predators. The parsleyworm has an orange "forked gland", called the osmeterium. When in danger, the osmeterium, which looks like a snake's tongue, everts and releases a foul smell to repel predators.

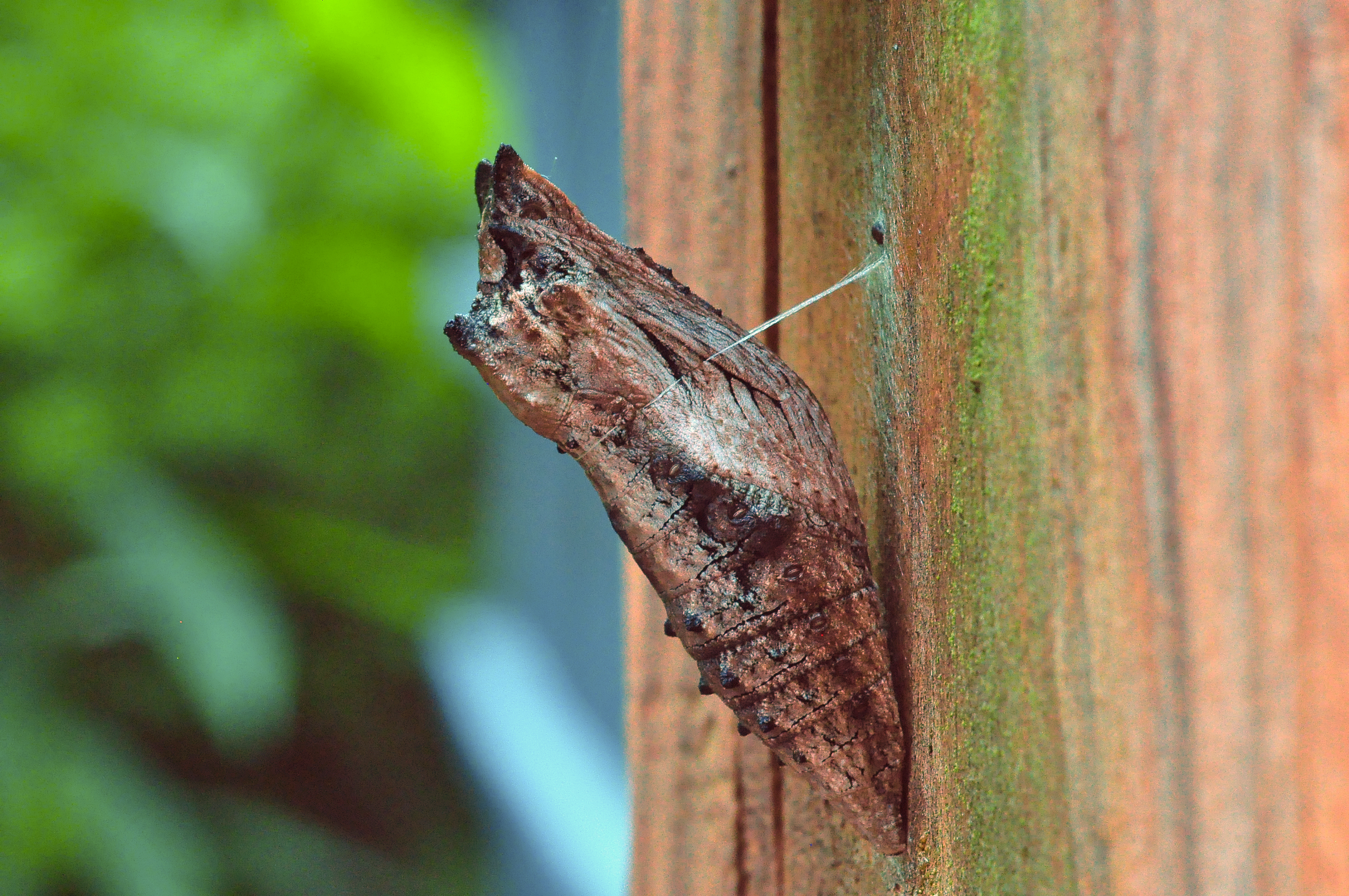
Black swallowtail chrysalis, brown color morph

The pupae may be green or brown, but not depending on surroundings or the background on which they have pupated. The color of the chrysalis is determined by a local genetic balance that ensures the majority of pupae will blend in. A section of the green pupae will turn a much darker green at the very end of the pupae stage. This color change occurs a few hours to a full day before hatching. Unusually, this butterfly's chrysalis is girdled with a loop, with its feet attached to the silk pad, which helps the butterfly to unfold its very large wings when crawling out.

=== Sexual dimorphism ===
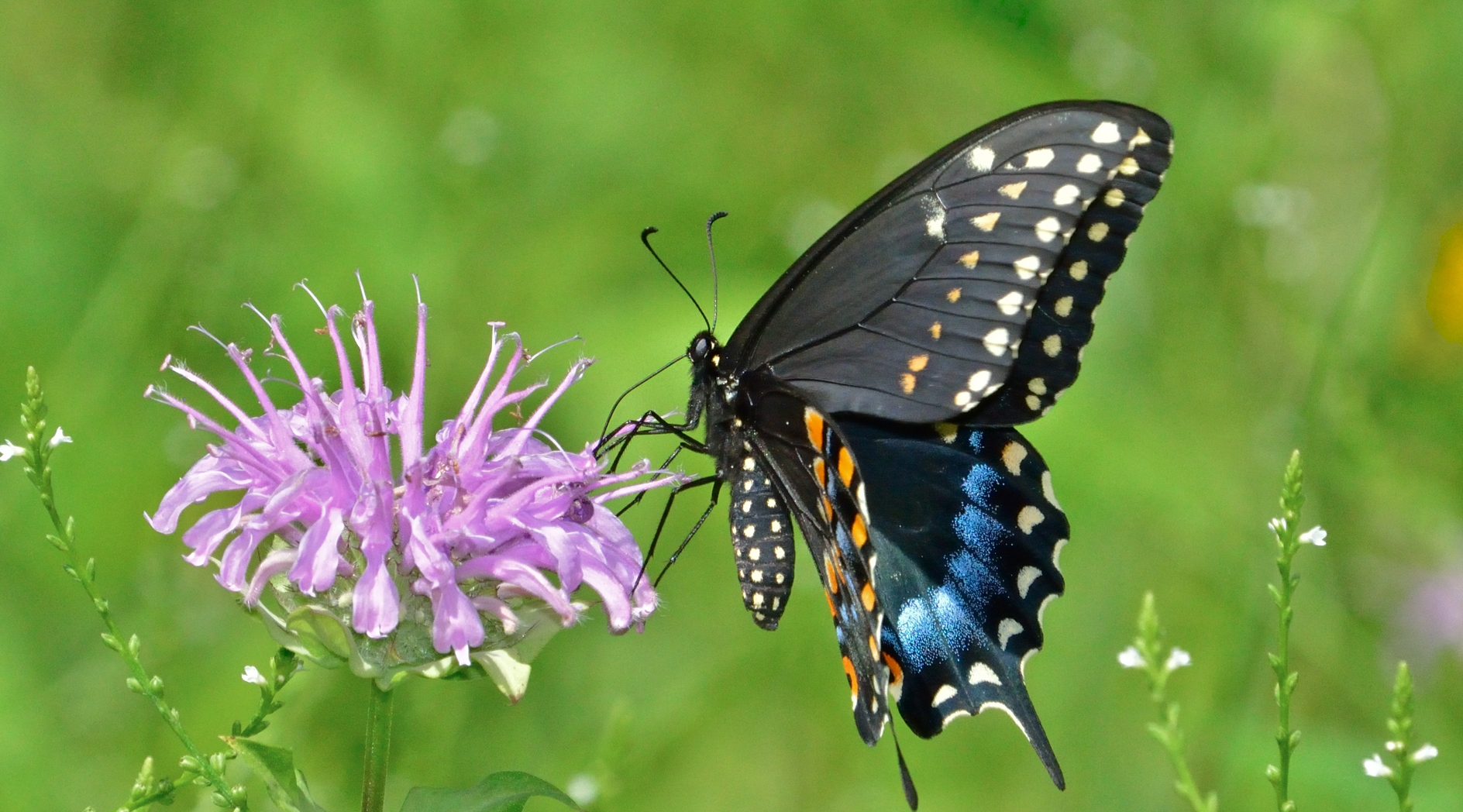
Papilio polyxenes female, Stokes State Forest, New Jersey, United States

The black swallowtail has a wingspan of 6.9–8.4 cm, and females are typically larger than males. The upper wing surface is black with two rows of yellow spots – these spots are large and bright in males and smaller and lighter in females. Females have a prominent blue area between these two rows, while males have a much less prominent blue area. These differences give rise to effective Batesian mimicry of Battus philenor seen in females.

Both sexes show a red spot with a black bullseye on the inner hind margin of the hindwings and an isolated yellow spot on the front edge of the wings. The ventral side of wings of males and females are essentially identical: forewings have two rows of pale yellow spots, and hindwings have rows of bright orange spots separated by areas of powdery blue. The ventral side also acts as an effective mimic for both males and females for protection against predators.

== Mimicry ==
Female markings are similar to those of B. philenor, allowing females to engage in dorsal mimicry to reduce risk of predation by birds that preferentially prey on the black swallowtail. Females have evolved dorsal mimicry because they spend more time revealing their dorsal wing side during oviposition. The ventral wing surface of the black swallowtail also mimics that of B. philenor, so both males and females are protected when their ventral wing surface is displayed.

=== Intrasexual selection ===
Male black swallowtails can sometimes mimic the female wing-back pattern, and therefore succeed in reduced predation as well. However, males of the typical coloration are more successful in intrasexual competition for mating territories compared to the males who mimic the female wing pattern. Females have no preference based on wing markings, and are equally likely to mate with a typical versus an alternative coloration. Therefore, male-male intrasexual selection is of greater importance than female mate choice in maintaining the classic male wing-back coloration and pattern.

== Life cycle ==
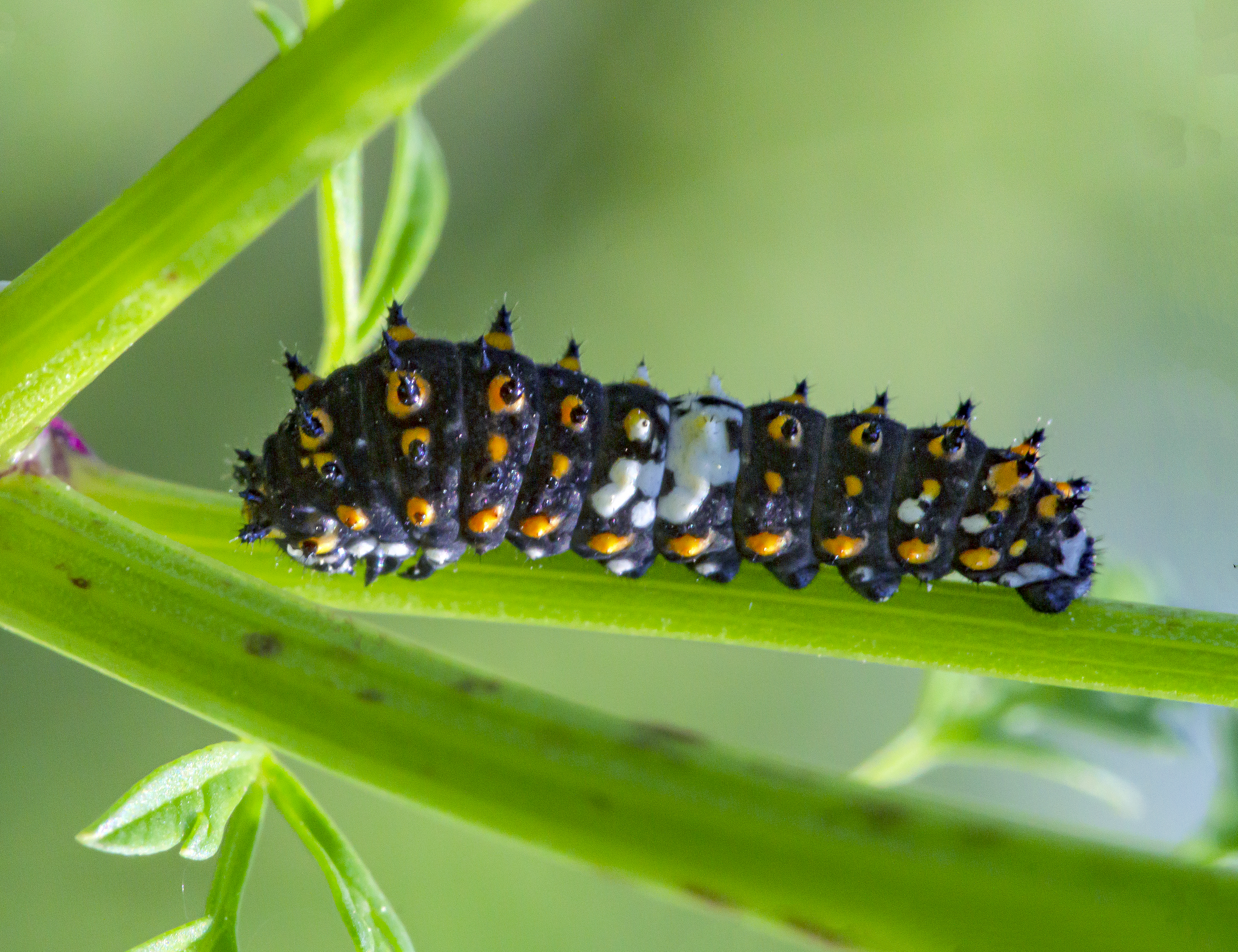
Papilio polyxenes caterpillar first instar

Females lay single eggs on host plants, usually on the new foliage and occasionally on flowers. The eggs stage lasts 4–9 days, the larval stage 10–30 days, and the pupal stage 18 days. The duration of these stages may vary depending on temperature and the species of the host plants.

Feeny et al., 1985 finds that survival of eggs and larvae of P. polyxenes varies depending on the location (near Ithaca, New York) where the eggs were laid. Eggs laid on wild carrot or parsnip plants were more likely to survive to the fifth instar than were eggs laid on poison hemlock. Eggs laid on plants at elevations of 300 to 435 metres (984 to 1,427 ft) above sea-level were more likely to survive than eggs laid at 120 meters above sea-level. There were also significant differences in survival rates between early and late broods in a year, and between years. In all cases, the primary cause of mortality was predation.

=== Emergence ===
Winter is spent in the chrysalis stage, and adults will emerge in the spring to seek out host plants. Adults will emerge in the mornings on a daily basis. First brood adults will fly from mid-May until late June, second brood adults will fly from early July until late August, and occasionally a partial third brood will occur that will emerge later in the season.

Black swallowtail nectaring

=== Life expectancy ===
Members of the black swallowtail are long lived compared to other butterflies that inhabit temperate zones. They encounter little predation and are quick and agile if they are disturbed. However, mortality from predators will occur during roosting and during unfavorable weather due to the associated increase in predation. Adult butterflies are at the highest risk for predation when they are incapable of flight or are starved from poor weather.

== Food plants ==
Papilio polyxenes use a variety of herbs in the carrot family (Apiaceae), but will choose the food plants for their larvae based on visual and chemical variations. Host plant odor is one of the cues involved in the selection of landing sites for oviposition. The responses to these cues are innate, and feeding on a host plant as a larva does not increase the preference for that plant as an adult.

Species of host plants include:

- American angelica, Angelica atropurpurea
- Hairy angelica, Angelica venenosa
- Dill, Anethum graveolens
- Cutleaf waterparsnip, Berula erecta
- Spotted water hemlock, Cicuta maculata
- Canadian honewort, Cryptotaenia canadensis
- Queen Anne's lace, Daucus carota
- Wedgeleaf eryngo, Eryngium cuneifolium
- Fennel, Foeniculum vulgare
- Cow parsnip, Heracleum maximum
- Lovage, Levisticum officinale
- Cucumber magnolia, Magnolia acuminata
- Sweetbay magnolia, Magnolia virginiana
- Sweet cicely, Osmorhiza claytonii
- Long-styled sweet cicely, Osmorhiza longistylis
- Canby's dropwort, Oxypolis canbyi
- Water cowbane, Oxypolis filiformis
- Parsnip, Pastinaca sativa
- Parsley, Petroselinum crispum
- Mock bishopweed, Ptilimnium capillaceum
- Rue, Ruta graveolens
- Water parsnip, Sium suave
- Roughfruit scaleseed, Spermolepis divaricata
- Yellow pimpernel, Taenidia integerrima
- Northern prickly ash, Zanthoxylum americanum
- Golden alexanders, Zizia

== Behavior ==
=== Thermoregulation ===
Core body, or thoracic temperatures of around 24 degrees Celsius are necessary for flight. Therefore, the black swallowtail will regulate thoracic temperatures by behaviorally changing their abdomen position, wing position, orientation to the sun, perching duration, and perching height. In lower temperatures, butterflies will raise their abdomens above flattened wings, and will perch relatively close to the ground. In higher temperatures, butterflies will lower their abdomens in the shade of their wings. Higher temperatures are also associated with shorter perch durations, greater flight durations and higher perch heights.

=== Territorial defense ===
Male butterflies secure territories to use in mate location and courtship. These territories contain no significant concentration of nectar sources, larval host plants or night settling sites. Once secured, a male will maintain exclusive use of a territory 95% of the time. Males will aggressively chase other males who approach their territory, and then return to their territory. Success in defending a territory depends on the number of competitors and his previous success, but the size of the male is not a contributing factor. Males that emerge early in the brood are more likely to defend a female-preferred territory. These males will have early access to available territories, and will choose the ones that are most preferred by females. What makes a territory desirable by females remains unknown, and is only measured by the number of aggressive encounters between males and the overall mating frequency at these sites.

Male territories are generally of high relative elevation and topographic distinctness. This feature serves as an advantage to the lek mating system described later, as males will be concentrated in predictable locations and will be easy to encounter by females.

==== Aggression ====
In previous studies, nearly 80% of successful courtship flights were confined to a male's territory. Because a preferred territory site is crucial in mating success, males are extremely aggressive in maintaining their territory. Black swallowtails have a 4:1 male biased sex ratio, and a low female mating frequency which leads to intense male-male competition.

== Mating systems ==
=== Protandry ===
The black swallowtail is protandrous, meaning males emerge before females. This emergence pattern is advantageous, because males that emerge earlier have a greater success in competing for superior territories, indicated by female preference. These superior territories will most likely still be available for early emerging males, and securing one of these territories is highly predictive of mating success. Furthermore, female fertility is directly correlated with their weight at emergence. This favors larger females, and explains why they emerge later to prolong the larval feeding period. Male success is not dependent on size, so selection favors early emergence to get the best territories preferred by females, though this will most likely result in smaller males. However, there is a drawback to this emergence system. For biological reasons, overall male mating frequency decreases as the mating season goes on. Therefore, early emerging males with early access to preferred territories will not be able to mate as often later in the mating season when female emergence is at its peak.

=== Lek mating ===
This type of territorial organization leads the black swallowtail to engage in a lek mating system. These butterflies satisfy the four criteria for lekking behavior, as defined by J.W. Bradbury: (1) there is no male parental care, (2) males aggregate at specific sites for display, (3) the only resource females find at the lek are the males themselves and (4) females can select their mates.

The territory that has the most male-male encounters can be seen as being the most desirable to both males and females, and is also the territory that has the highest female visitation rate. Hilltop leks give the advantage to females because they make it easy to locate mates, and competition for superiority creates an array of males who have already demonstrated their quality as a mate.

==== Copulation ====
Males can only mate twice a day, but females will mate more than once to replace a sperm supply that has deteriorated with time. P. polyxenes has a long mating period due to females tendency to mating multiple times and having a broad emergence period. This allows males to mate several times during their lifetime, despite only being able to copulate twice on the same day. The black swallowtail engages in brief courtship flights, and copulations will last around 45 minutes.

== Similar species ==
- Old World swallowtail (Papilio machaon)
- Indra swallowtail (Papilio indra)
- Short-tailed swallowtail (Papilio brevicauda)
- Anise swallowtail (Papilio zelicaon)

== In popular culture ==
The Papilio polyxenes was named the official state butterfly of New Jersey on January 11, 2016.

== Gallery ==
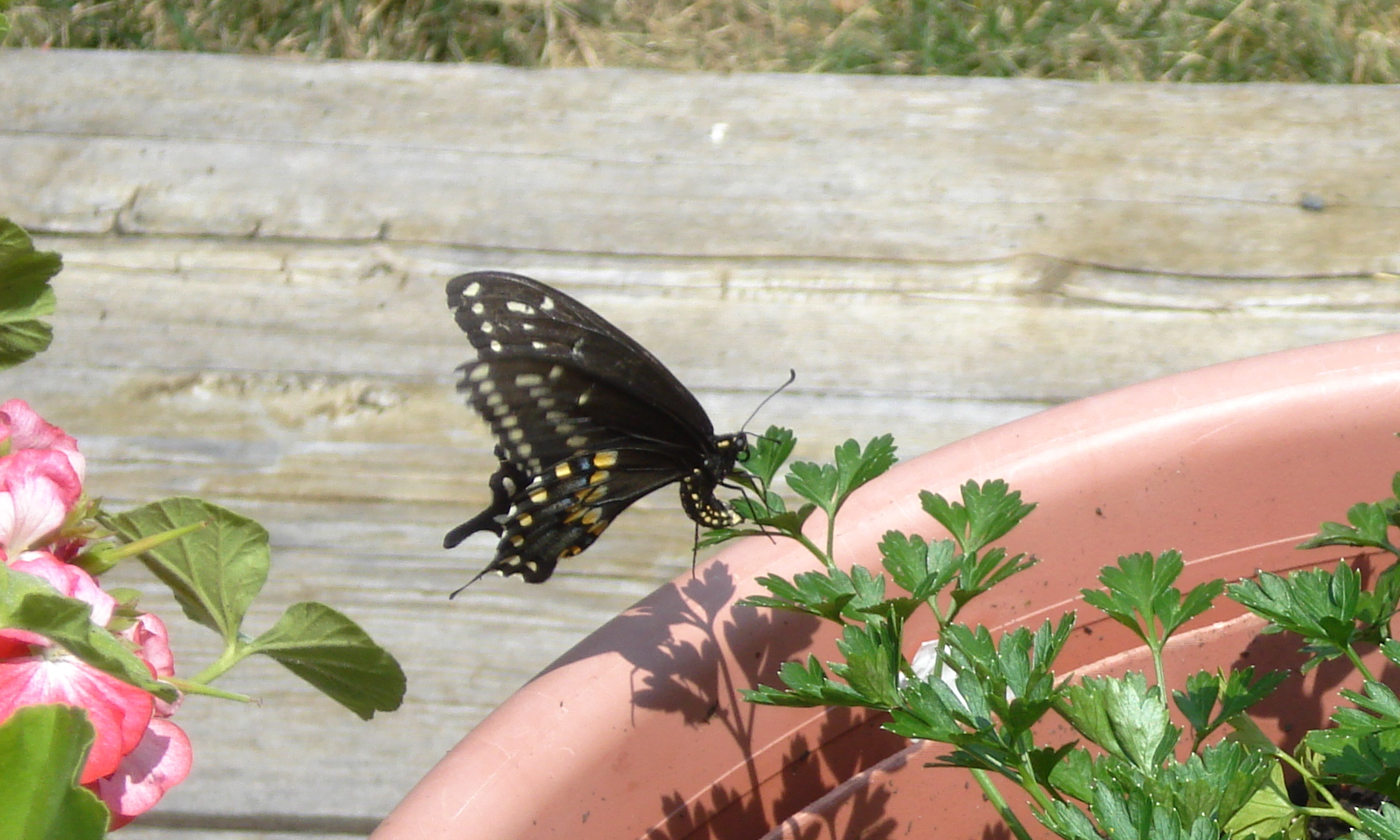
Laying eggs on parsley

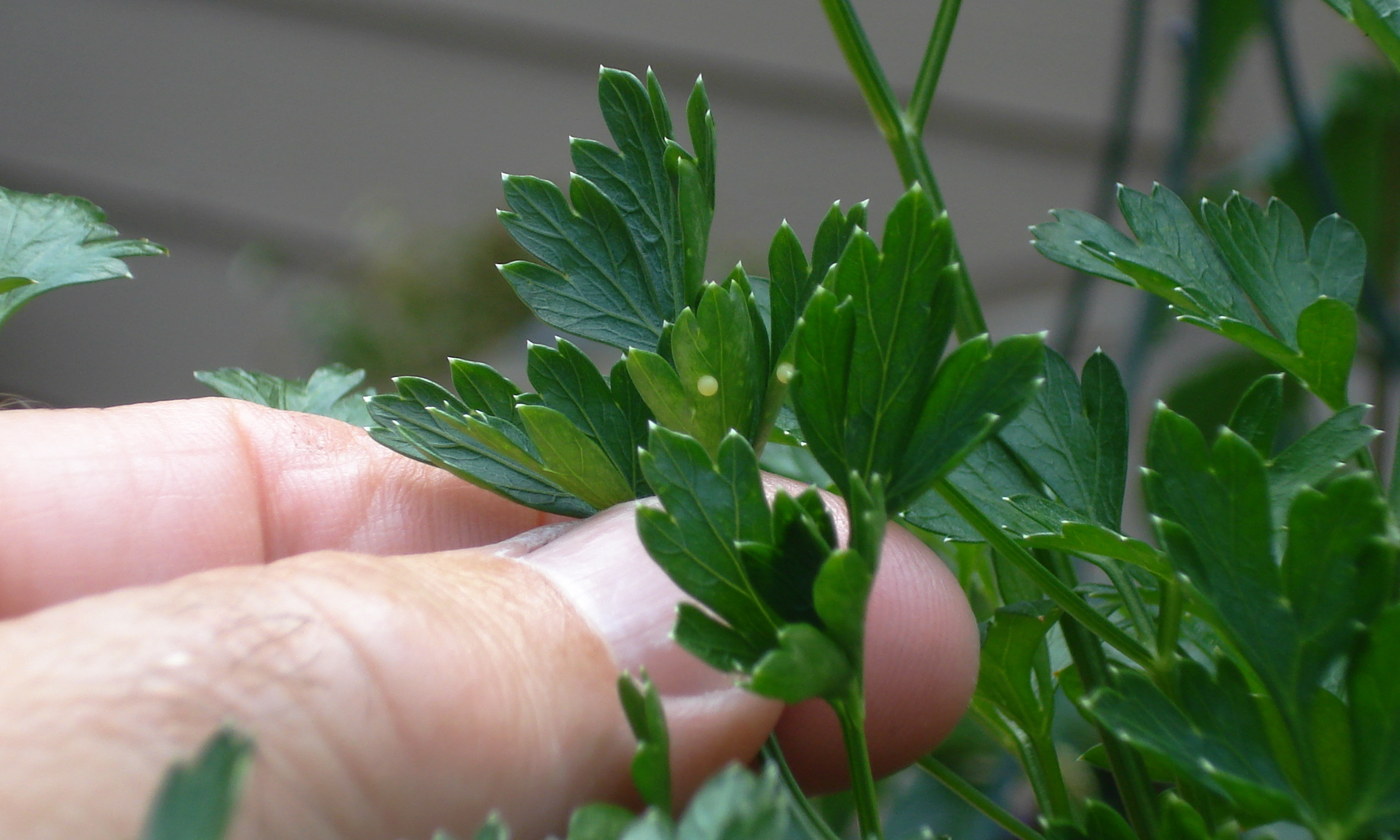
Eggs on parsley

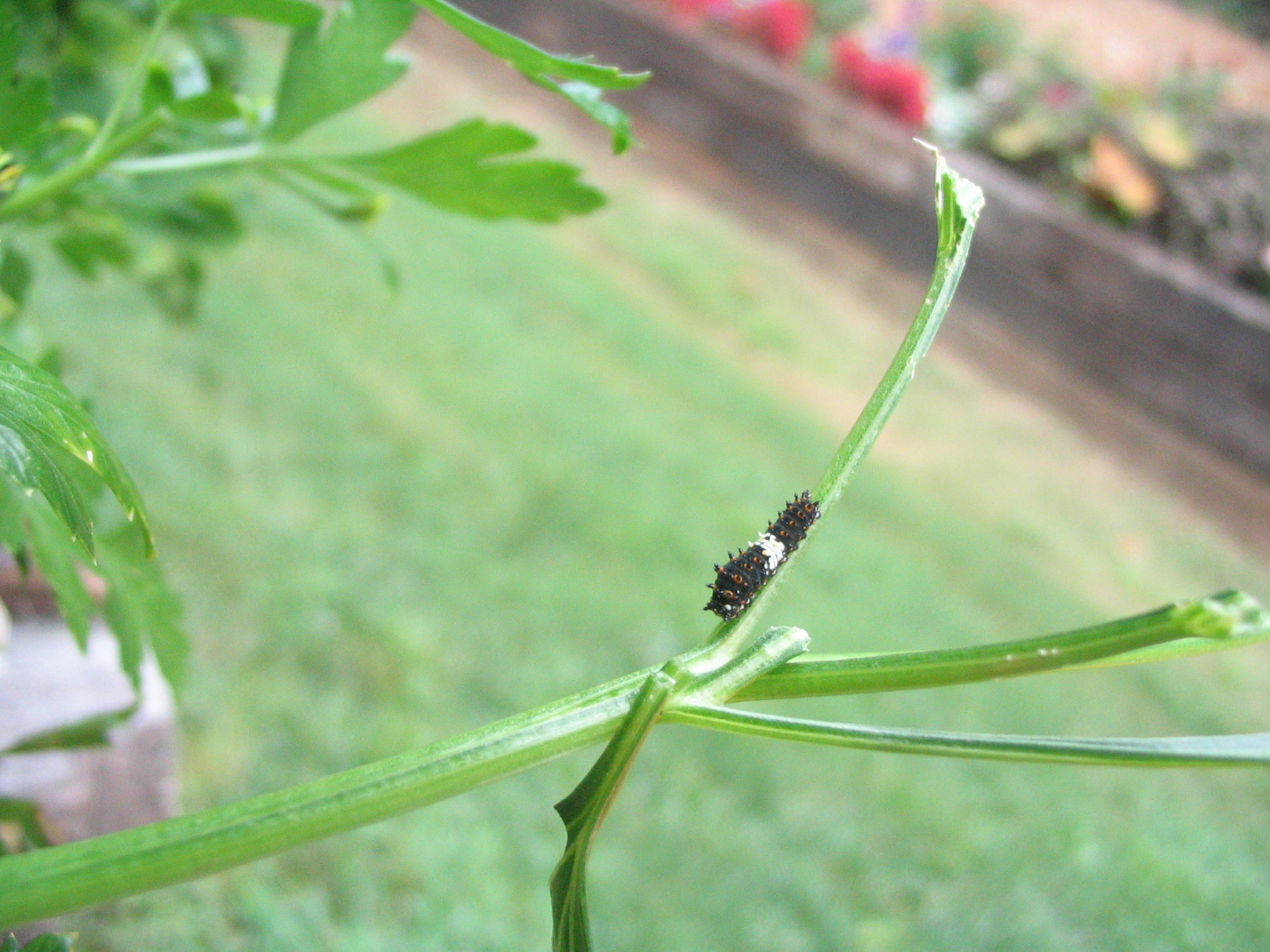
First-instar caterpillar in northeast Georgia

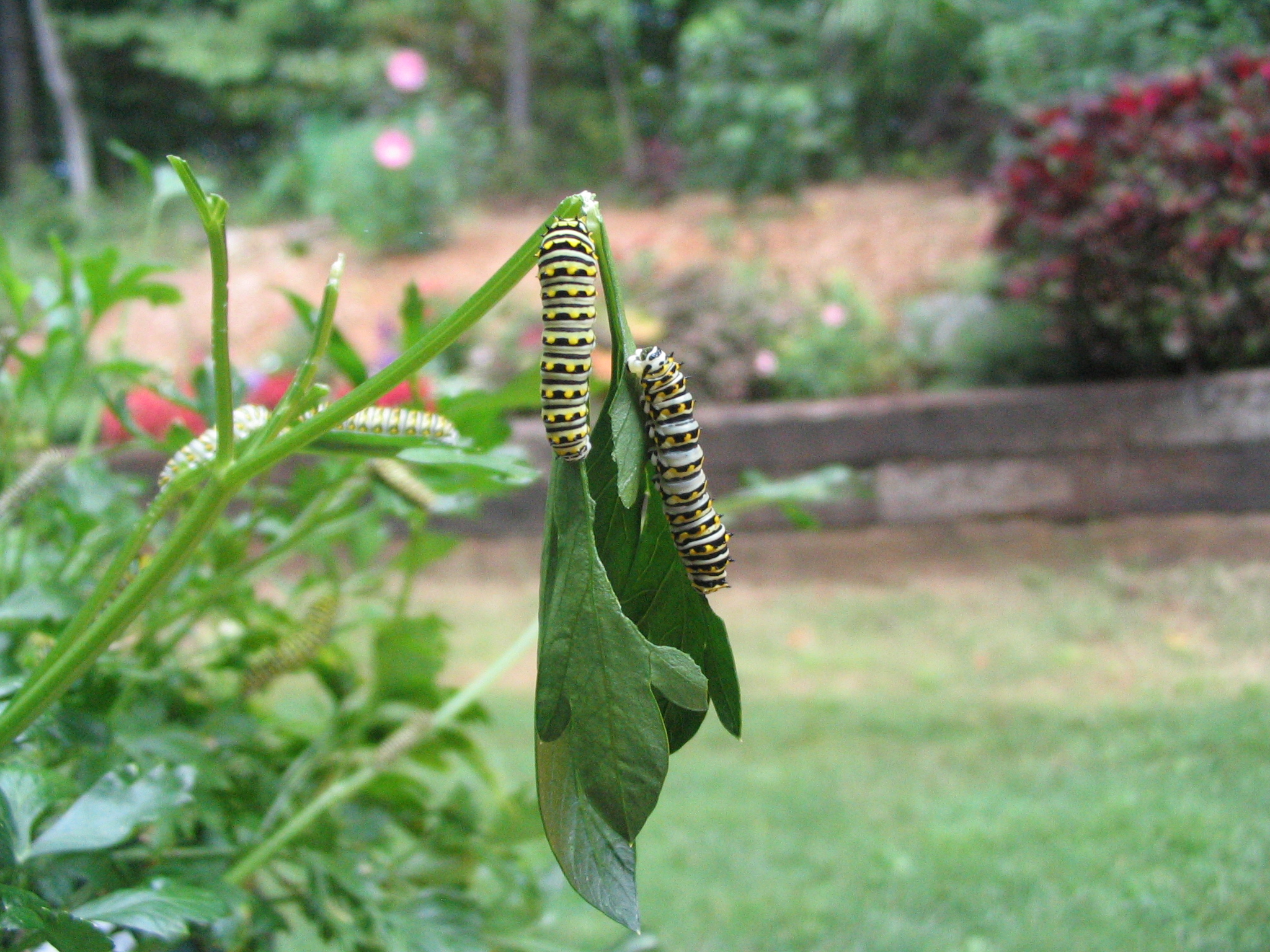
These second- or third-instar larvae in northeast Georgia still have spikes.

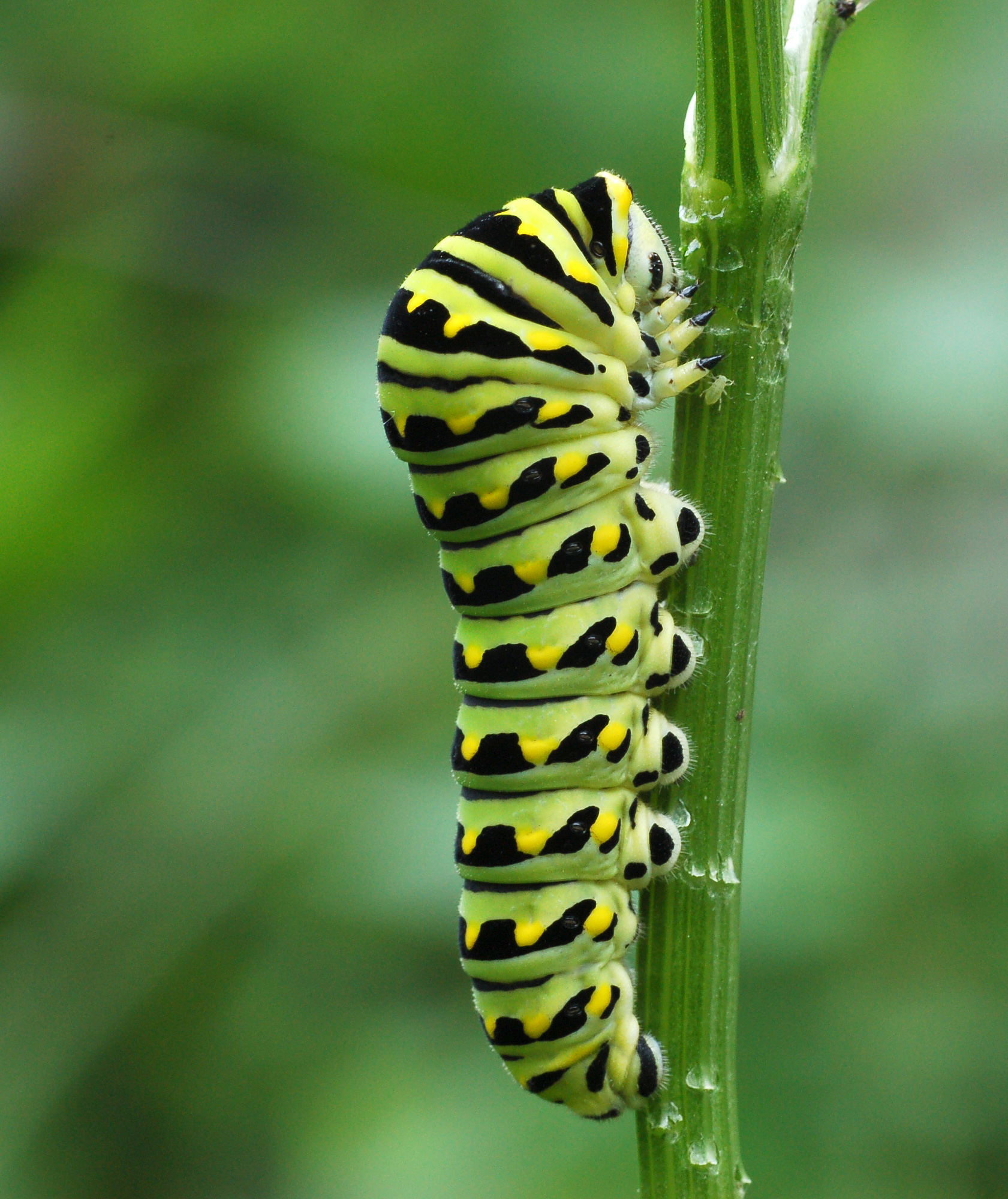
Late-instar caterpillar (without spikes) soon ready to pupate

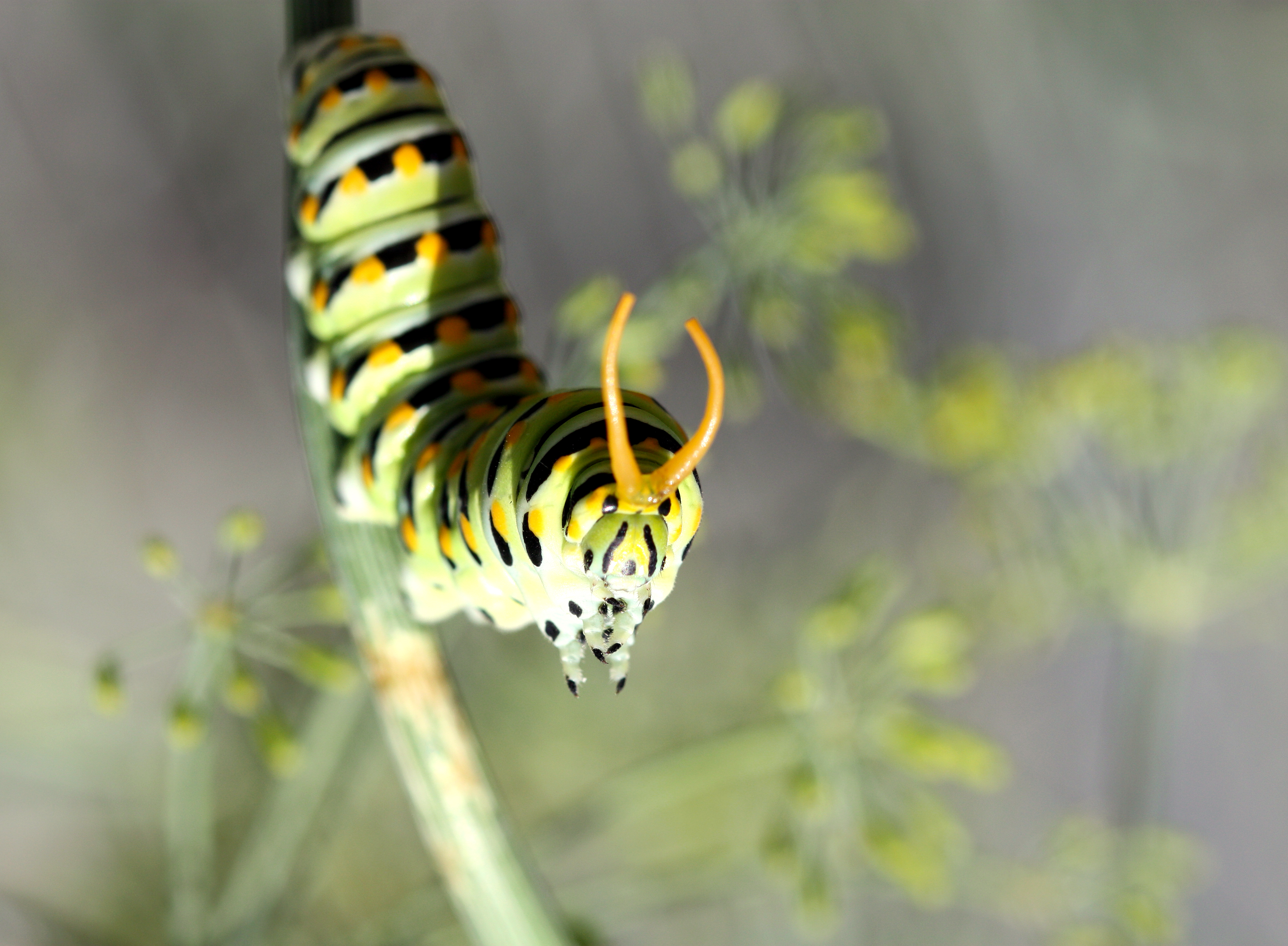
Osmeterium visible after slight provocation

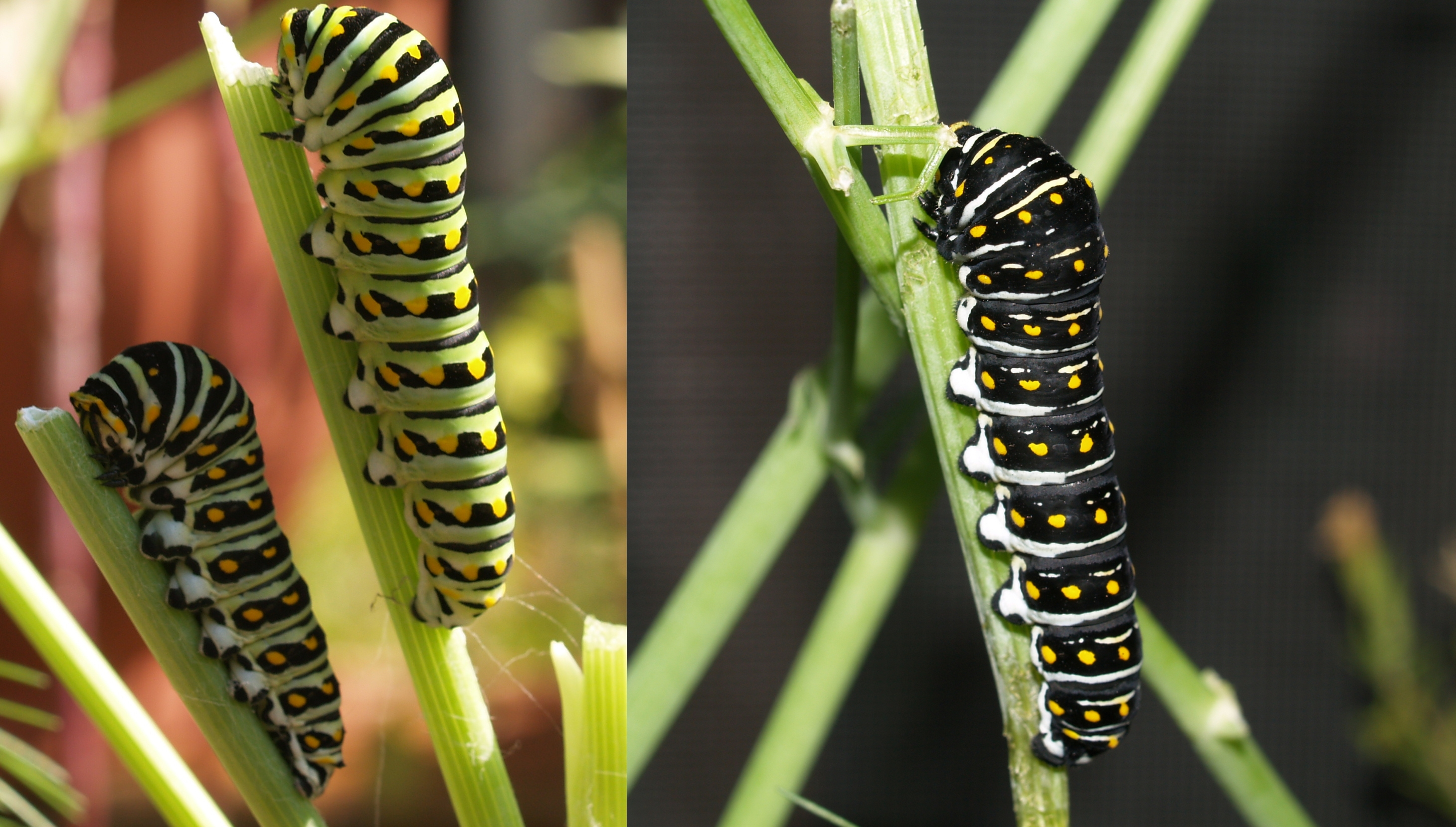
Caterpillar color variations

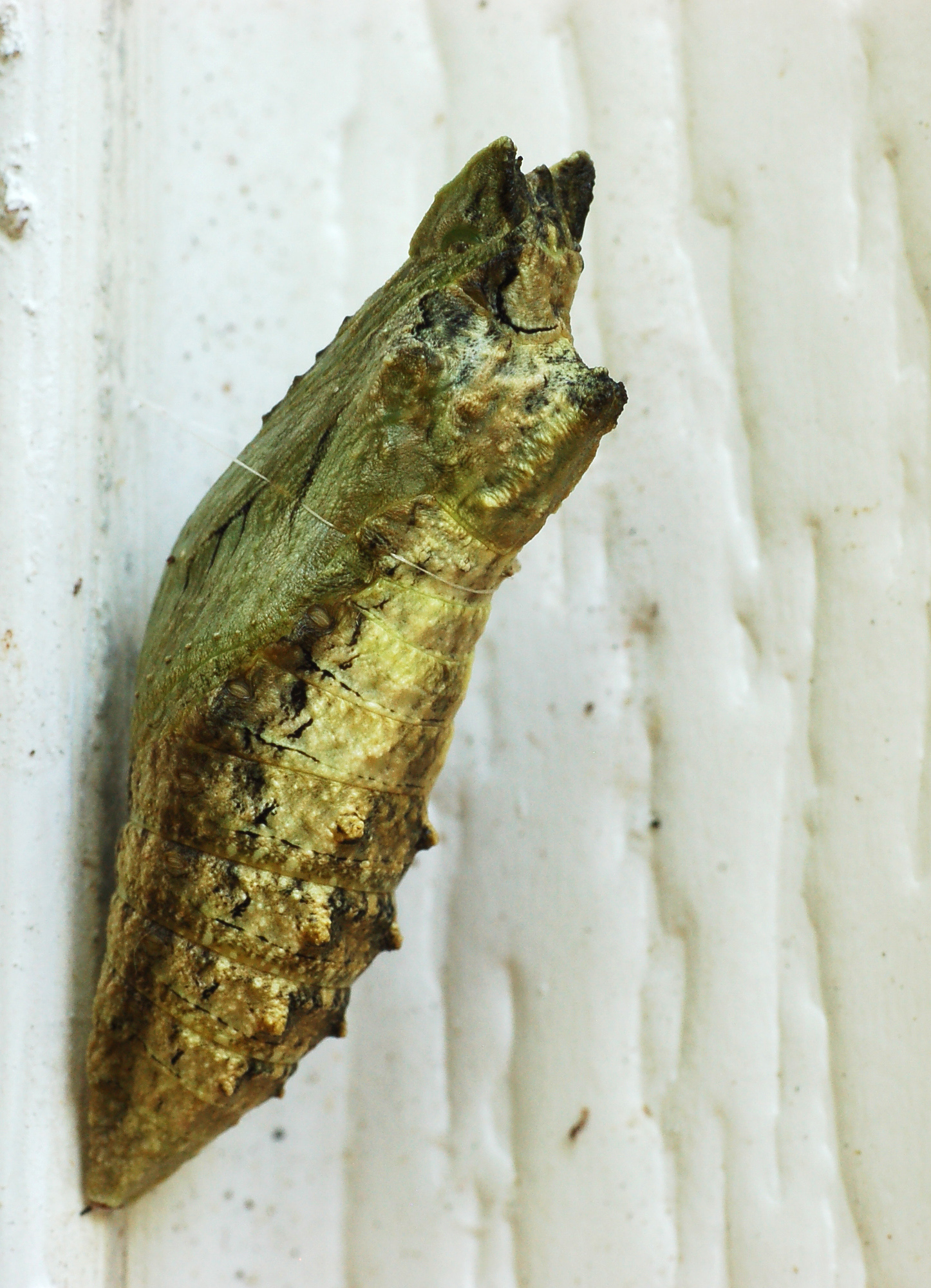
Greenish-brown chrysalis

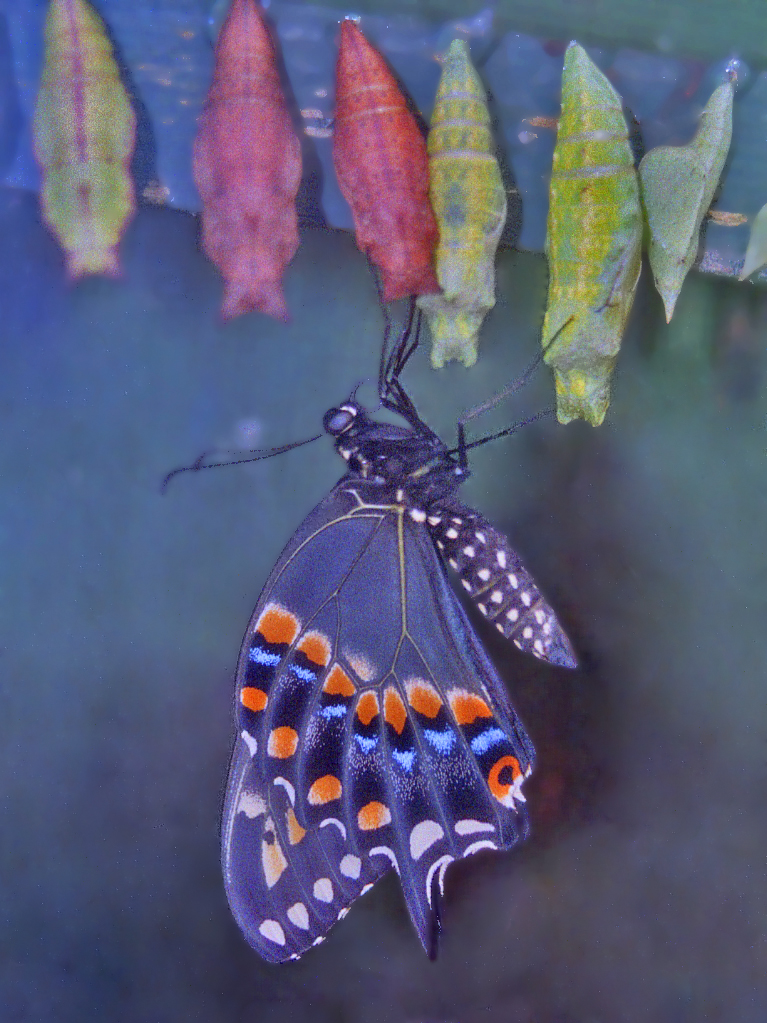
Ventral view with chrysalis

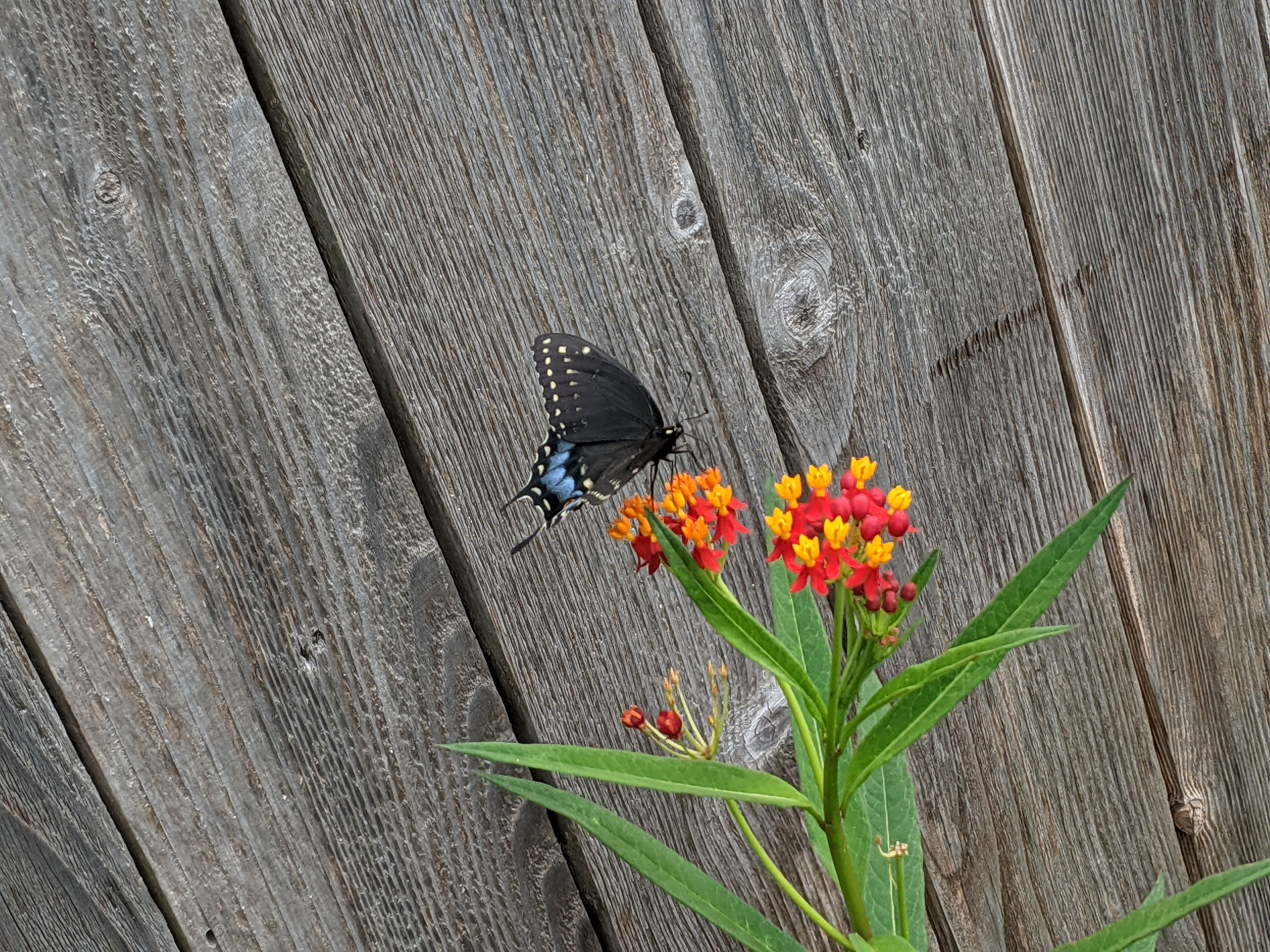
Black Swallowtail in North Houston, TX
