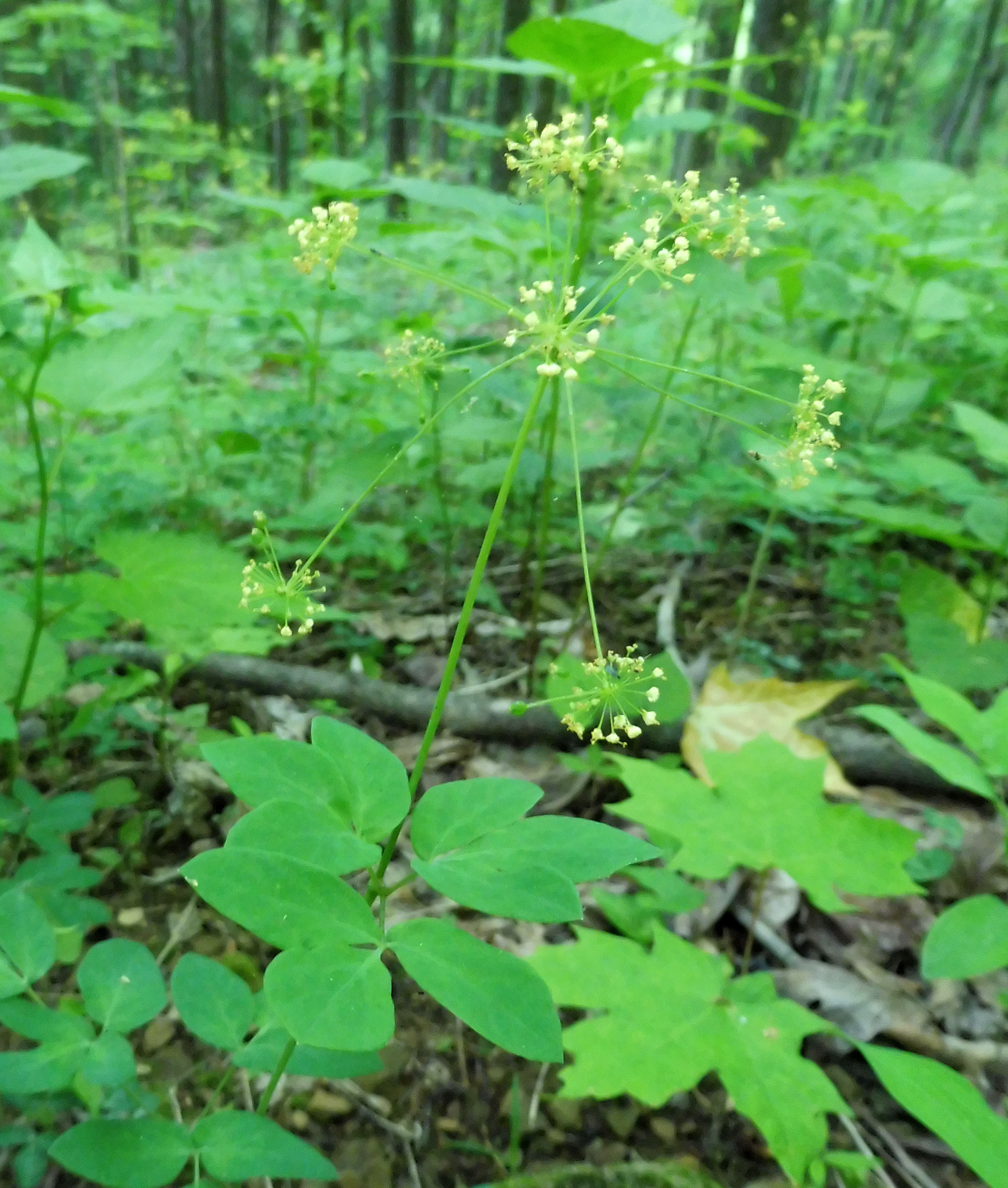

Scientific classification
- Kingdom: Plantae
- Clade: Tracheophytes
- Clade: Angiosperms
- Clade: Eudicots
- Clade: Asterids
- Order: Apiales
- Family: Apiaceae
- Genus: Taenidia
- Species: T. integerrima

Binomial name
- Taenidia integerrima (L.) Drude

= Taenidia integerrima =

Species of flowering plant

Taenidia integerrima, the yellow pimpernel, is an herbaceous plant in the parsley family. It is native to the eastern North America, where it is widespread. Its natural habitat is rocky prairies and woodlands, often over calcareous substrates. It is a perennial.

== Conservation status in the United States ==
It is listed as endangered in Connecticut, as historical in Rhode Island, and threatened in Vermont.

== Native American ethnobotany ==
The Menominee take an infusion of root taken for pulmonary troubles, chew the steeped root for 'bronchial affections', and use it as a seasoner for other remedies because of the good smell. The Ojibwe smoke the seeds in a pipe before hunting for good luck.

== Gallery ==
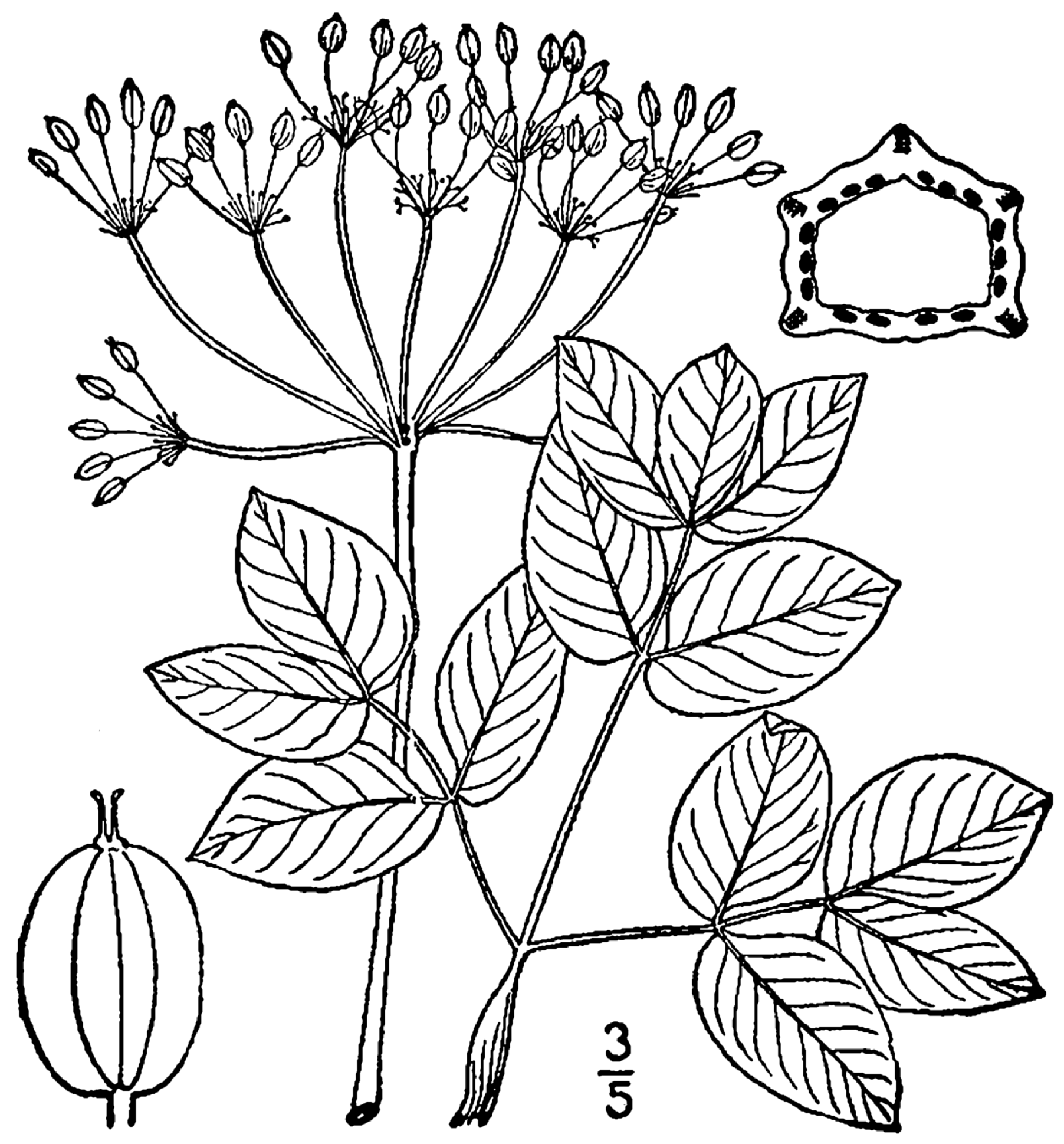
An illustration showing detail of the reproductive features
