= Aerial bombing of cities =

Bombardment of a city from aircraft

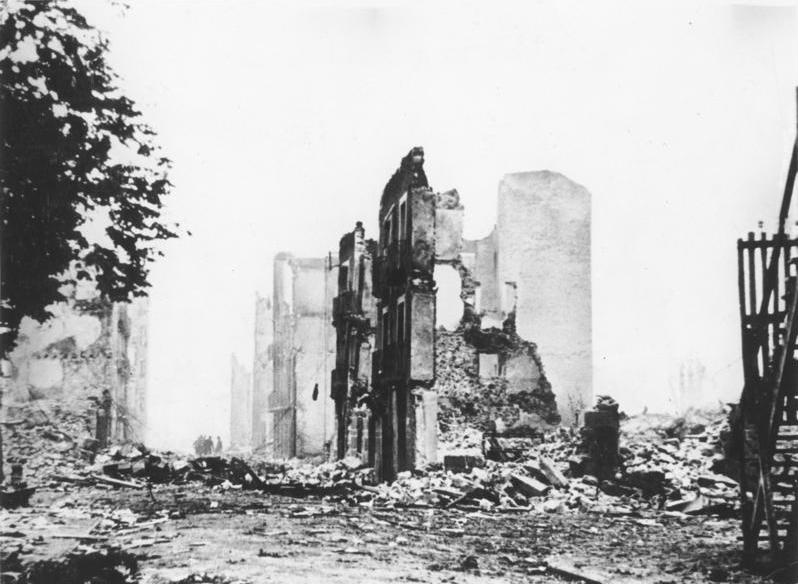
Ruins left after the bombing of Guernica during the Spanish Civil War by Nazi Germany's Condor Legion (1937)

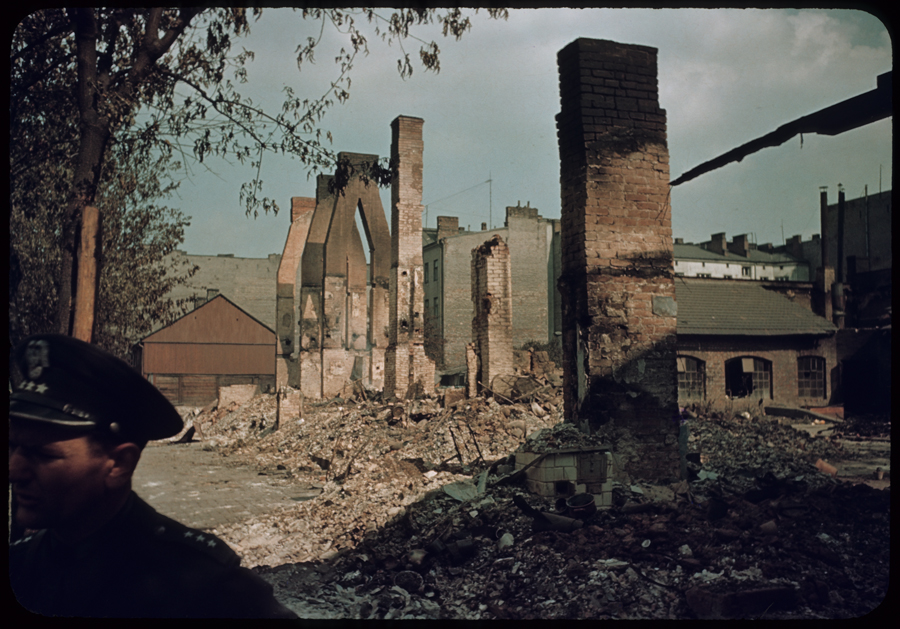
The results of German bombardment in Warsaw, Poland (1939)

Frampol before (left) and after (right) the German Luftwaffe bombing raids in September 1939 during early World War II (the town was almost completely destroyed).

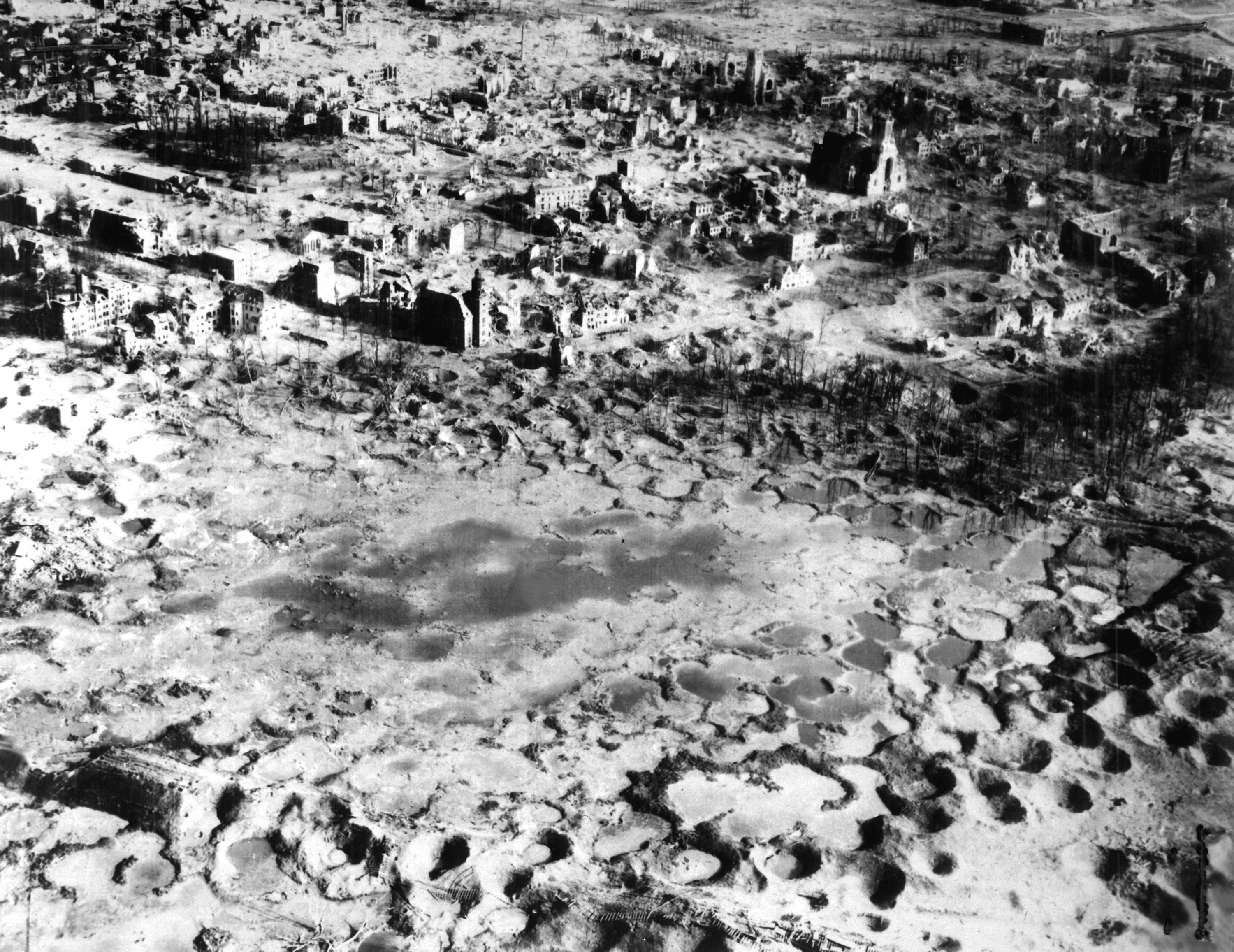
The German town of Wesel after intensive Allied area bombing in 1945 near the end of World War II (a destruction percentage of 97% of all buildings)

The aerial bombing of cities is an optional element of strategic bombing, which became widespread in warfare during World War I. The bombing of cities grew to a vast scale in World War II and is still practiced today. The development of aerial bombardment marked an increased capacity of armed forces to deliver ordnance from the air against combatants, military bases, and factories, with a greatly reduced risk to its ground forces. The killing of civilians and non-combatants in bombed cities has variously been a deliberate goal of strategic bombing, or unavoidable collateral damage resulting from intent and technology. A number of multilateral efforts have been made to restrict the use of aerial bombardment so as to protect non-combatants, including civilian populations.

The morality of urban area bombing and the protection of non-combatants were much debated in the period 1945 to 1949, primarily as a result of the Allied bombings of German industrial centers and Japanese cities. This international discussion led to the 1949 Geneva Conventions, the fourth of which addressed the protection of civilians in time of war. The 1977 First Additional Protocol—not finalized until many years after, but not ratified by the United States even today—prohibits indiscriminate and disproportionate bombing, including bombardments that treat cities, towns and villages as a single military objective.

== Before World War I ==
=== Kites ===
Incendiary kites were first used in warfare by the Chinese. During the Song dynasty the Fire Crow, a kite carrying incendiary powder, a fuse, and a burning stick of incense was developed as a weapon. Walter de Milemete's 1326 De nobilitatibus, sapientiis, et prudentiis regum treatise depicts a group of knights flying kites laden with a black-powder filled firebomb over the wall of city. In the 17th century, the forces of Thai king Phetracha tied gunpowder barrels to kites used for airborne assault.

=== First Italian War of Independence ===
In 1849, Austrian forces besieging Venice during the First Italian War of Independence launched some 200 incendiary balloons, each carrying a 24- to 30-pound bomb that was to be dropped from the balloon with a time fuse over the besieged city. The balloons were launched from land and from the Austrian navy ship SMS Vulcano that acted as a balloon carrier, though the attack ended in failure as winds blew the balloons away, none reaching their intended target.

=== Italian Invasion of Libya ===
The first ever air raid was conducted during the Italo-Turkish War by Italian forces against the Ottoman province of Libya on 1 November 1911. Giulio Gavotti dropped 1.5 kg of bombs on Ain Zara, a village 8 km west of the capital Tripoli.

=== First Balkan War ===
Adrianople (now Edirne) was bombed by Bulgaria in 1912 in the First Balkan War. Historically, it was the first bombardment of a city from a heavier-than-air aircraft. In the morning of 29 October 1912 at 9:30 am the plane Albatros F-3 took off from an airfield near the village of Mustafa Pasha—present day Svilengrad, Bulgaria. The pilot was captain Radul Mikov with spotter and bombardier Prodan Tarakchiev. The airfield was specially created to carry out the take off and landing. According to the report weather conditions were perfect. The flight lasted for 1 hour and 20 minutes and the altitude was 500 meters. During the flight the crew flew over the city of Edirne, discovered hidden Ottoman forces in the nearby villages and flew towards to city railroad station, near the village of Karaagach. The plane was equipped with two bombs, which were released at 10:00 am over the station. The crew landed successfully at the airfield with 4 holes on the hull. A number of journalists and military attachés attended the site.

=== Mexican Revolution ===
In May 1914, during the Mexican Revolution of 1910–17, General Venustiano Carranza, later president, ordered a biplane to bomb Neveria Hill adjacent to the downtown area of Mazatlán in order to take the city. The bomb landed not on target but in a city street and in the process killed four civilians, including a French diplomat, and wounded several others.

== World War I ==
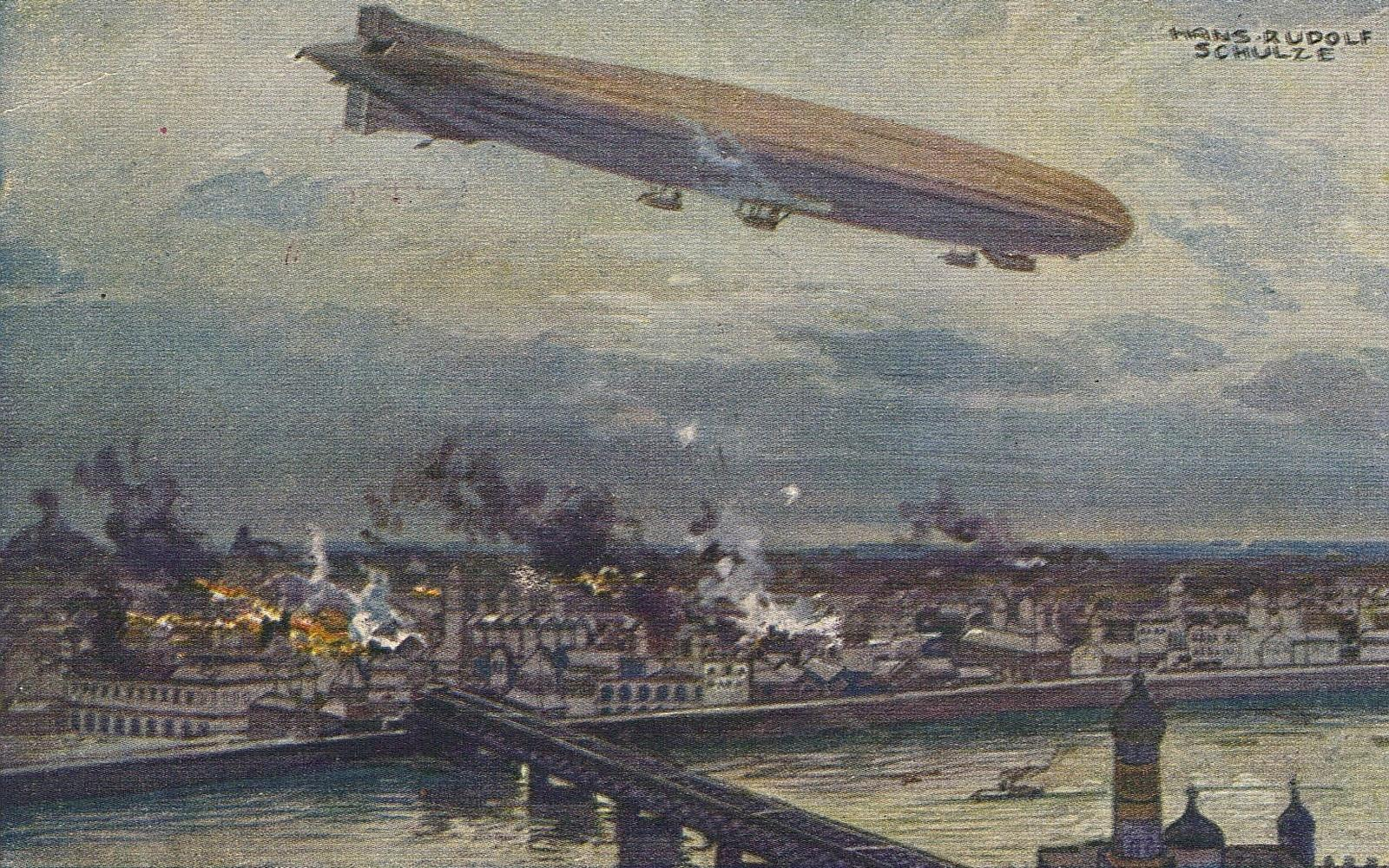
German airship Schütte Lanz SL2 bombing Warsaw in 1914

The first civilian target to be bombed from the air was the Belgian city of Antwerp. This city, at that moment the National Redoubt of Belgium, was bombed during the night of 24–25 August 1914. Instead of targeting the surrounding fortresses, the Zeppelin LZ 25's intention was to bomb the clearly distinguishable historical centre of the city. The zeppelin dropped approximately ten bombs, killing ten people and injuring forty. The British Royal Naval Air Service (RNAS) undertook the first Entente strategic bombing missions on 22 September 1914 and 8 October, when it bombed the Zeppelin bases in Cologne and Düsseldorf. The aeroplanes carried twenty-pound bombs, and at least one airship was destroyed. On the night of 19 January 1915, two Imperial German Navy Zeppelins, L 3 and L 4, carried out the first air raid on England, dropping twenty-four 50 kg high-explosive bombs and eleven 28 kg incendiary bombs on the English coastal towns of Great Yarmouth, Sheringham, King's Lynn, and the surrounding villages. In all, four people were killed, 16 were injured, and monetary damage was estimated at £7,740.

London was bombed for the first time on 30 May 1915. In July 1916, the German government allowed directed raids against urban centers, sparking 23 airship raids in 1916 in which 125 tons of ordnance were dropped, killing 293 people and injuring 691. Gradually, British air defenses improved, and the Germans also introduced large bomber aircraft for bombing Britain. In 1917 and 1918, there were only eleven Zeppelin raids against England, and the final raid occurred on 5 August 1918, which resulted in the death of KK Peter Strasser, commander of the German Naval Airship Department. By the end of the war, 51 raids had been undertaken, in which 5,806 bombs were dropped, killing 557 people and injuring 1,358. In the course of the Zeppelin raids the Germans lost more than half their airships and 40% of their crew. It has been argued that the raids were effective far beyond material damage inflicted, in diverting and hampering wartime production, and diverting twelve squadrons and over 10,000 men to air defenses. The British developed an Independent Force of long-range bombers that could bomb Berlin, but the war ended before these raids began.

After the war, bombers' increasing sophistication led to the general belief that aerial bombing would both destroy cities and be impossible to stop; as Stanley Baldwin stated in a 1932 speech, "The bomber will always get through".

== Interwar period ==
=== Iraqi revolt against the British ===
After World War I, there were protests in Iraq against continued British rule. Many Iraqis across a wide spectrum of opinion opposed the British Mandate for Iraq. The Iraqi revolt against the British began, with peaceful demonstrations in May 1920. Initial demands were rejected by the British administration, and fighting broke out in June 1920. This was suppressed, with many deaths, and at very high costs to the Empire. A policy of 'aerial policing', an invention of Winston Churchill's was brought in. This amounted to aerial bombing of rebelling tribesmen, followed up by pacification by ground troops. This continued up to the mid 1920s. The aerial campaign included Sir Arthur Harris, who commanded a Vickers Vernon squadron engaged in the bombing and strafing of revolting tribesmen. Harris once remarked that "the only thing the Arab understands is the heavy hand."

=== Somaliland Campaign ===
Following the end of World War I, the British stepped up their efforts in their war against the Dervish state, their haroun leaders such as commander Ismail Mire, headman Diiriye Guure and emir "Mohammed Abdullah (Sayyid)", so-called "Mullah", whom they had been fighting for the control of the area then known as the Nugaal. However, they had been unable to defeat the Dervish state for nearly 25 years. In January 1920, the British launched a combined aerial and land attack against the Dhulbahante garesas, bombarding Taleeh, the capital of the revolt. The Dervish war has been described as one of the bloodiest and longest-running conflicts in the history of sub-Saharan Africa and the native forces are noted for concurrently repelling the invading British, Italian and Abyssinian forces for a period of 25 years.

=== Tulsa race massacre ===
In the United States during the Tulsa race massacre of 31 May – 1 June 1921, private aircraft flown by white men dropped kerosene bombs on the Greenwood neighborhood.

=== Escobar Rebellion ===
During the Escobar Rebellion in Mexico in 1929, Irish pilot and mercenary Patrick Murphy mistakenly dropped several improvised "suitcase bombs" on the border town of Naco, Arizona, while bombing government forces in the adjacent town of Naco, Sonora, for the Mexican Army rebels. The bombing, which caused damage to many buildings and injured several bystanders on the American side of the international border, became the first aerial bombardment of the Continental United States by a foreign power in American history.

=== Second Italo-Abyssinian War ===
The Italians used aircraft against the Ethiopian cities in the Second Italo-Abyssinian War. For example, in February 1936, the Italian invasion forces in the south prepared for a major thrust towards the city of Harar. On 22 March, the Regia Aeronautica bombed Harar and Jijiga as a prelude. Both cities were reduced to ruins even though Harar had been declared an "open city".

=== Spanish Civil War ===
During the Spanish Civil War, the Nationalists under Francisco Franco made extensive use of aerial bombing on civilian targets. Nazi Germany gave aircraft to Franco to support the overthrow of the Spanish Republican government. The first major example of this came in November 1936, when German and Spanish aircraft bombed Republican-held Madrid; this bombardment was sustained throughout the Siege of Madrid. Barcelona and Valencia were also targeted in this way. On 26 April 1937, the German Luftwaffe (Condor Legion) bombed the Spanish city of Guernica carrying out the most high-profile aerial attack of the war. This act caused worldwide revulsion and was the subject of a famous painting by Picasso, The number of lives lost in this raid is estimated to be somewhere between 500 and 1,600.

Shortly after, the front-page headlines of the Diario de Almería, dated 3 June 1937, referred to the press in London and Paris carrying the news of the "criminal bombardment of Almería by German planes".

Barcelona was bombarded for three days beginning on 16 March 1938, at the height of the Spanish Civil War. Under the command of the Italian dictator Benito Mussolini, Italian aircraft stationed on the island of Mallorca attacked 13 times dropping 44 tons of bombs, aimed at the civil population. The medieval Cathedral of Barcelona suffered bomb damage and more than one thousand people died, including many children. The number of people injured is estimated to be in the thousands. Many others Spanish towns and cities were bombed by the German Legion Condor and the Italian Aviazione Legionaria among them Jaen, Durango, Granollers and Alicante.

The Spanish Republican government also used aerial bombings, but not as extensively, as they did not have as many planes available. Cities such as Valladolid, Granada, Seville, Zaragoza and Burgos were bombarded, killing some people. The biggest aerial attack against civil population was in Cabra, a small town away from the war front, and with no strategic value, that was bombed due to an error. 109 people were killed and more than 200 wounded. Planes coming from Barcelona launched three bombs against the Cathedral-Basilica of Our Lady of the Pillar on 3 August 1936. The bombs failed to detonate, but did damage one of the cupolas painted by Goya. The fact was considered a miracle, as, if the bombs had exploded, the eastern half of the Cathedral would have been completely destroyed.

=== Second Sino-Japanese War ===
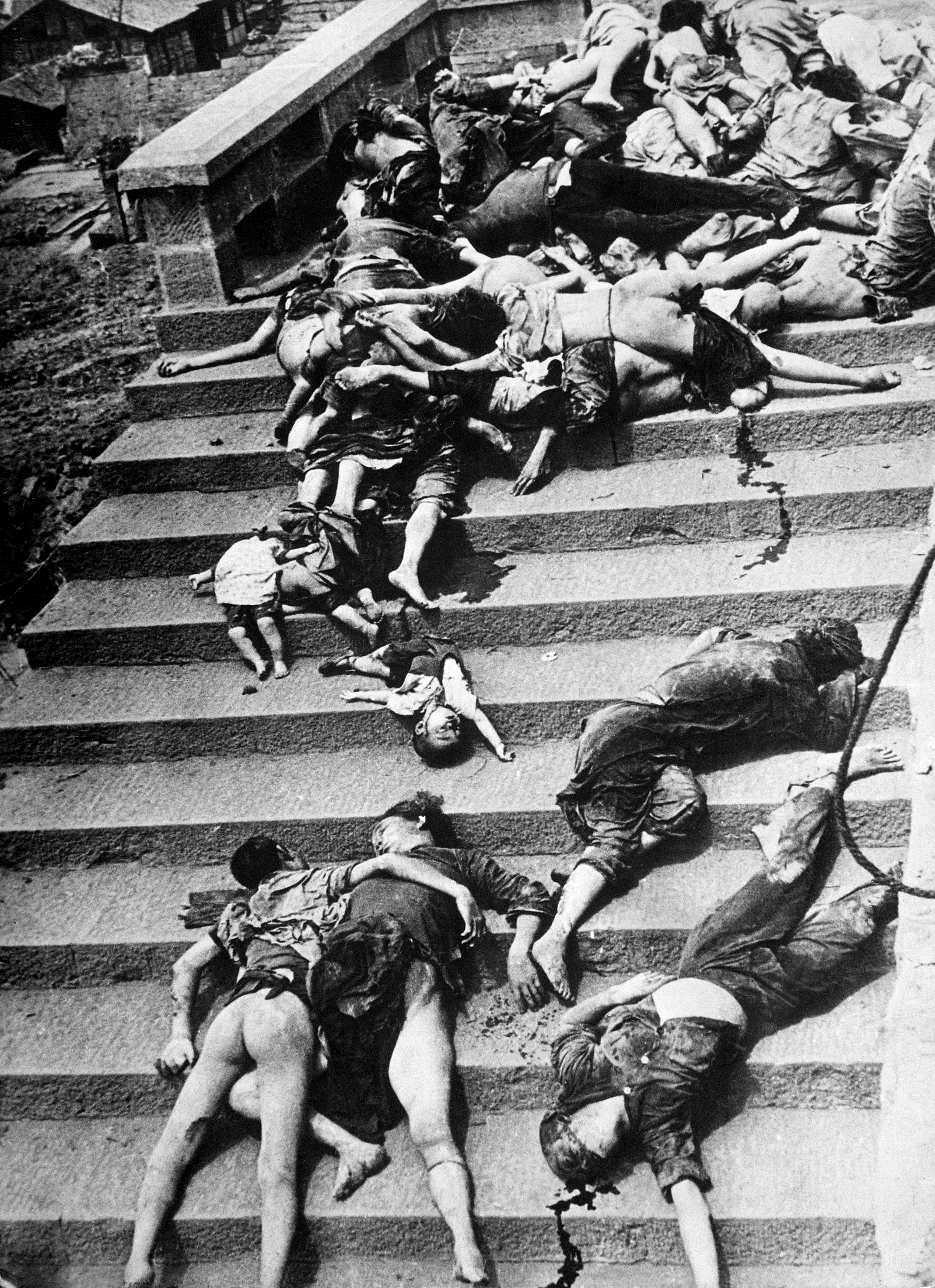
Casualties of a mass panic during a Japanese air raid in Chongqing (Chungking)

During the Manchurian Incident of 1931, the Japanese widely used airplanes to indiscriminately bomb key targets and cities, such as Mukden. After the Marco Polo Bridge Incident, the Imperial Japanese Army Air Service, in conjunction with the Imperial Japanese Navy Air Service, began relentlessly bombing Shanghai, Beijing (Peking), Tianjin (Tientsin), and several cities on the Chinese coast from the beginning of the Second Sino-Japanese War in 1937.

The bombing campaigns on Nanjing and Canton which started in September 1937 evoked protests from the Western powers culminating in a resolution by the Far Eastern Advisory Committee of the League of Nations. An example of the many expressions of indignation came from Lord Cranborne, the British Under-Secretary of State For Foreign Affairs:

Words cannot express the feelings of profound horror with which the news of these raids had been received by the whole civilized world. They are often directed against places far from the actual area of hostilities. The military objective, where it exists, seems to take a completely second place. The main object seems to be to inspire terror by the indiscriminate slaughter of civilians ...

== World War II ==
=== European Theatre ===
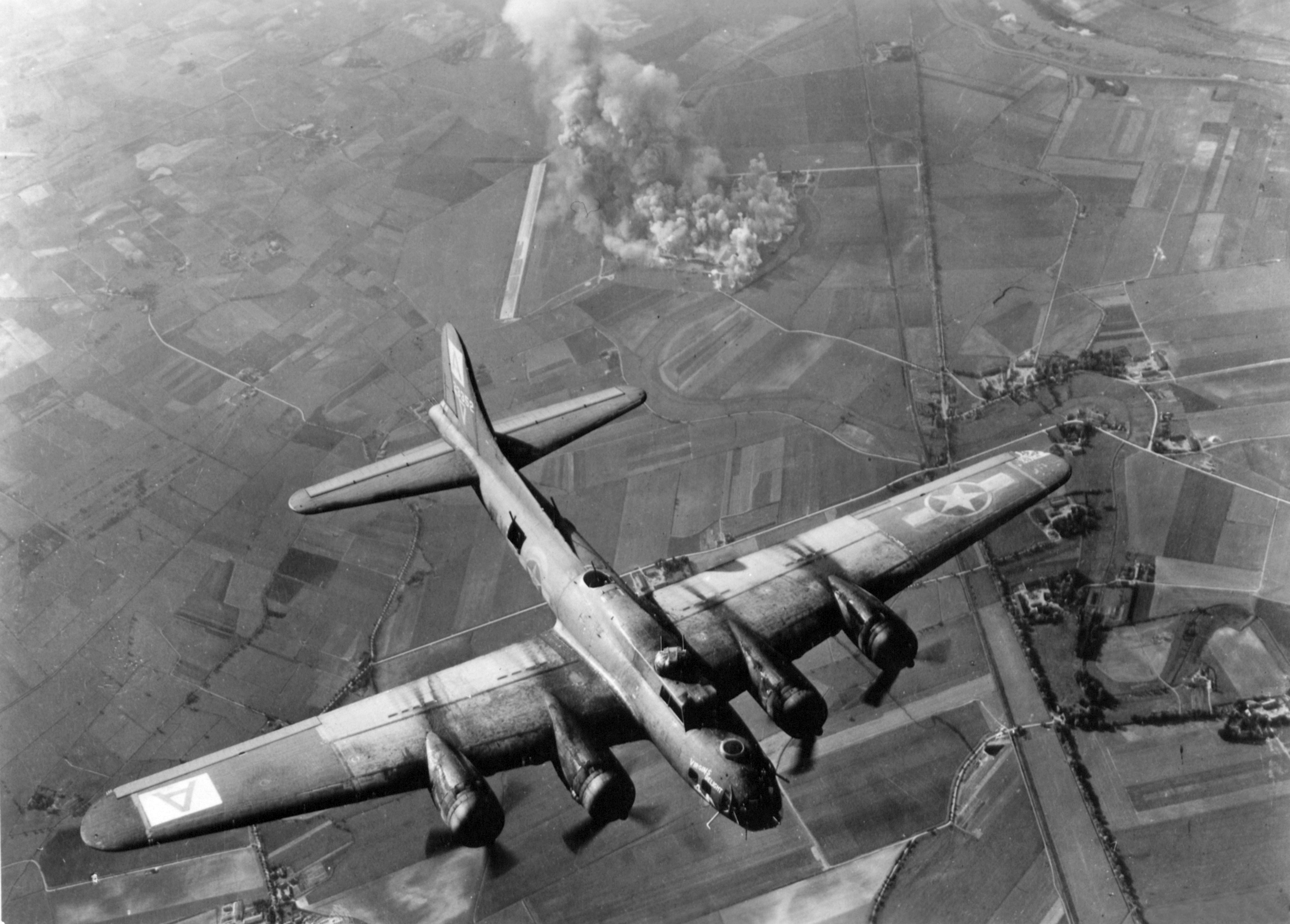
A raid by the 8th Air Force on the Focke Wulf factory at Marienburg, Germany (1943)

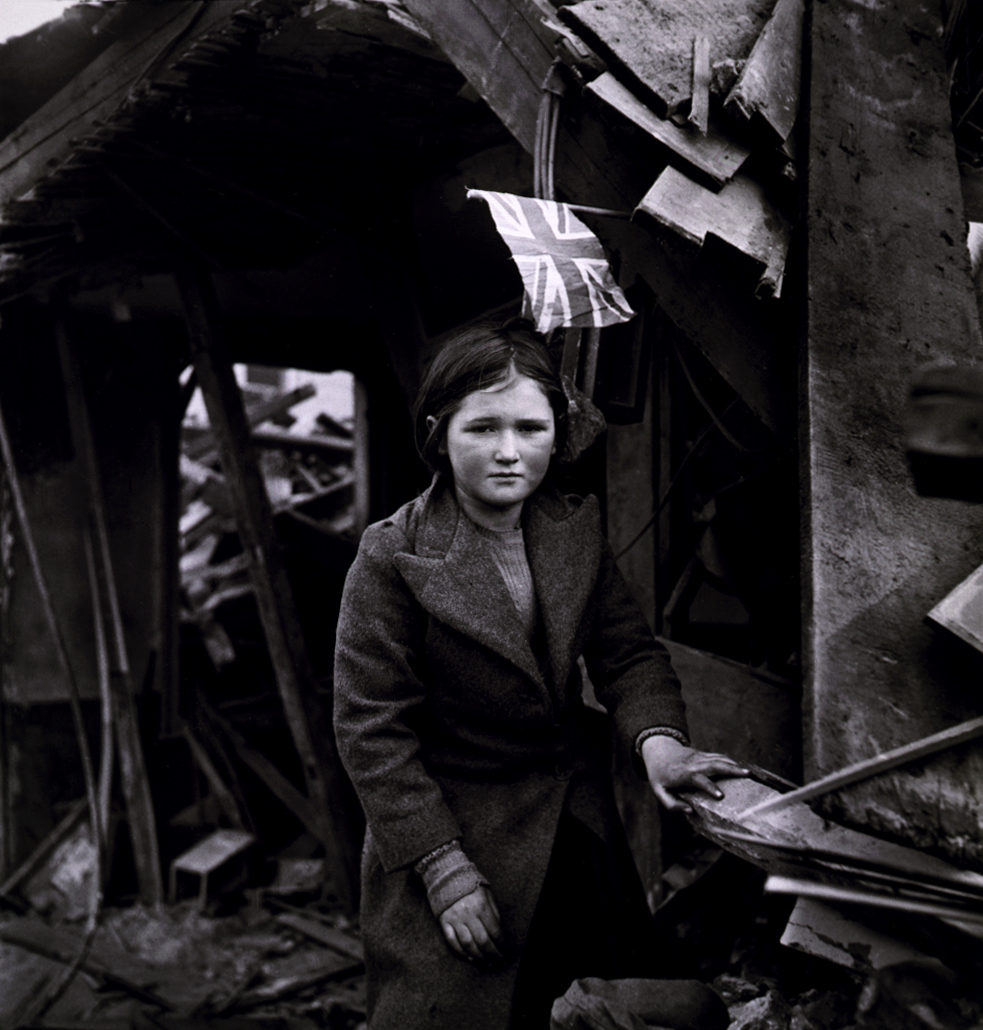
Aftermath of V-2 bombing at Battersea, London, 27 January 1945

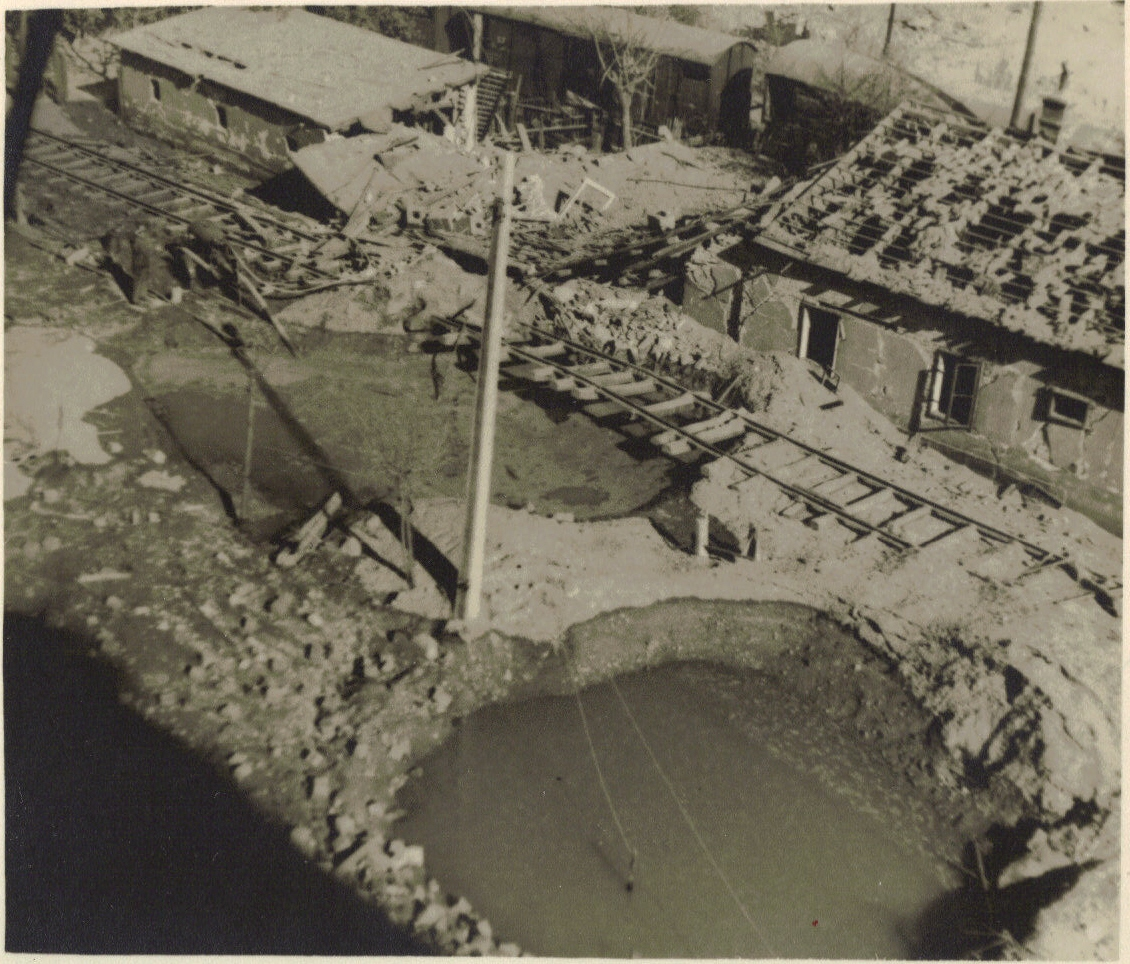
Results of the US-bombing of the Apollo company industrial plant in Bratislava (Slovakia) in September 1944

At the beginning of World War II, bombing of cities prior to invasion was an integral part of Nazi Germany's strategy. In the first stages of war, the Germans carried out many bombings of towns and cities in Poland (1939), including the capital Warsaw (also bombed in 1944), with Wieluń being the first city destroyed by 75%. The Soviet Union also attempted strategic bombing against Poland and Finland, bombing Helsinki.

Rotterdam was bombed by Germany at 14 May 1940. The city had already surrendered an hour earlier and the attack was called off, but this did not reach the already flying bombers.

Germany began aerial bombing of British cities immediately after the British declaration of war on Germany in September 1939, while the first British bombing raids against Germany were on the night of 15–16 May 1940, with 78 bombers against oil targets, nine against steelworks and nine against marshaling yards, all military and industrial targets in the German hinterland. Oil remained the main British objective until the summer of 1941, although German cities and towns were regularly bombed from May 1940. Previous raids had been carried out by the RAF, but when targets were not found, the bombers returned without making an attack.

After the Fall of France, the Luftwaffe redirected its full attention to the United Kingdom. The scale of the attack increased greatly in July 1940, with 258 civilians killed, and again in August with 1,075 dead. During the night of 25 August, British bombers raided targets in and around Greater Berlin for the first time, in response to the misdirected bombing of Oxford Street and the West End by the Luftwaffe while it was bombing the London docks. On 4 September 1940 Hitler, frustrated by the RAF's superiority over the Luftwaffe and enraged by its bombing of German cities, decided to retaliate by bombing London and other cities in the UK. On 7 September the Luftwaffe began massed attacks on London. The bombing campaign was known in the UK as "the Blitz", and ran from September 1940 through to May 1941. The Coventry Blitz and the Belfast Blitz were two of the heaviest of all bombings by the Luftwaffe, killing 568 to 1,000 civilians of Coventry, killing over 1,100 civilians in Belfast, and destroying much of both city centres.

British bombing policy evolved during the war. In the beginning, the RAF was forbidden to attack urban targets in Germany due to the risk of accidental civilian casualties. Following a German attack on military targets in the Orkney Islands on 16 March 1940 that killed a civilian, the RAF mounted an attack on the seaplane base on the island of Sylt. The RAF began attacking transport targets west of the Rhine on the night of 10 May following the German invasion of the Low Countries, and military targets in the rest of Germany after the bombing of Rotterdam. On 9 September 1940 RAF crews were instructed that due to the "indiscriminate" nature of German bombing, if they failed to find their assigned targets they were to attack targets of opportunity rather than bring their bombs home. On the 15–16 December the RAF carried out its first area bombing attack (destroying 45% of the city of Mannheim), officially in response to the raid on Coventry.

In 1942, the goals of the British attacks were defined: the primary goal was the so-called "morale bombing", to weaken the will of the civil population to resist. Following this directive intensive bombing of highly populated city centers and working class quarters started. On 30 May 1942, the RAF Bomber Command launched the first "1,000 bomber raid" when 1,046 aircraft bombed Cologne in Operation Millennium, dropping over 2,000 tons of high explosive and incendiaries on the medieval town and burning it from end to end. As a result of the bombing, more than 130,000 had to leave the city and 495 people were killed (411 civilians, 85 combatants).

Two further 1,000 bomber raids were executed over Essen and Bremen, but to less effect than the destruction at Cologne. The effects of the massive raids using a combination of blockbuster bombs and incendiaries created firestorms in some cities. The most extreme examples were caused by the bombings of Hamburg in Operation Gomorrah (45,000 killed), Dresden (25,000 killed), Kassel (10,000 killed), Darmstadt (12,500 killed), Pforzheim (21,200 killed), and Swinemuende (23,000 killed).

The Allies also bombed urban areas in the other countries, including occupied France (Caen) and the major industrial cities of northern Italy, like Milan and Turin. Some cities were bombed at the different times by the Luftwaffe and the Allies, for example Belgrade in Yugoslavia and Bucharest in Romania.

The Luftwaffe also bombed cities in the Soviet Union, destroying Stalingrad in a massive air raid at the start of the Battle of Stalingrad and bombing Leningrad during the siege of the city of 1941–1943. The Soviet bombing of the German cities was limited in comparison with the RAF bombing (destruction caused by the Soviet army was mainly due to the land artillery). The Soviet Air Force also bombed Budapest in Hungary.

=== Asiatic-Pacific Theatre ===
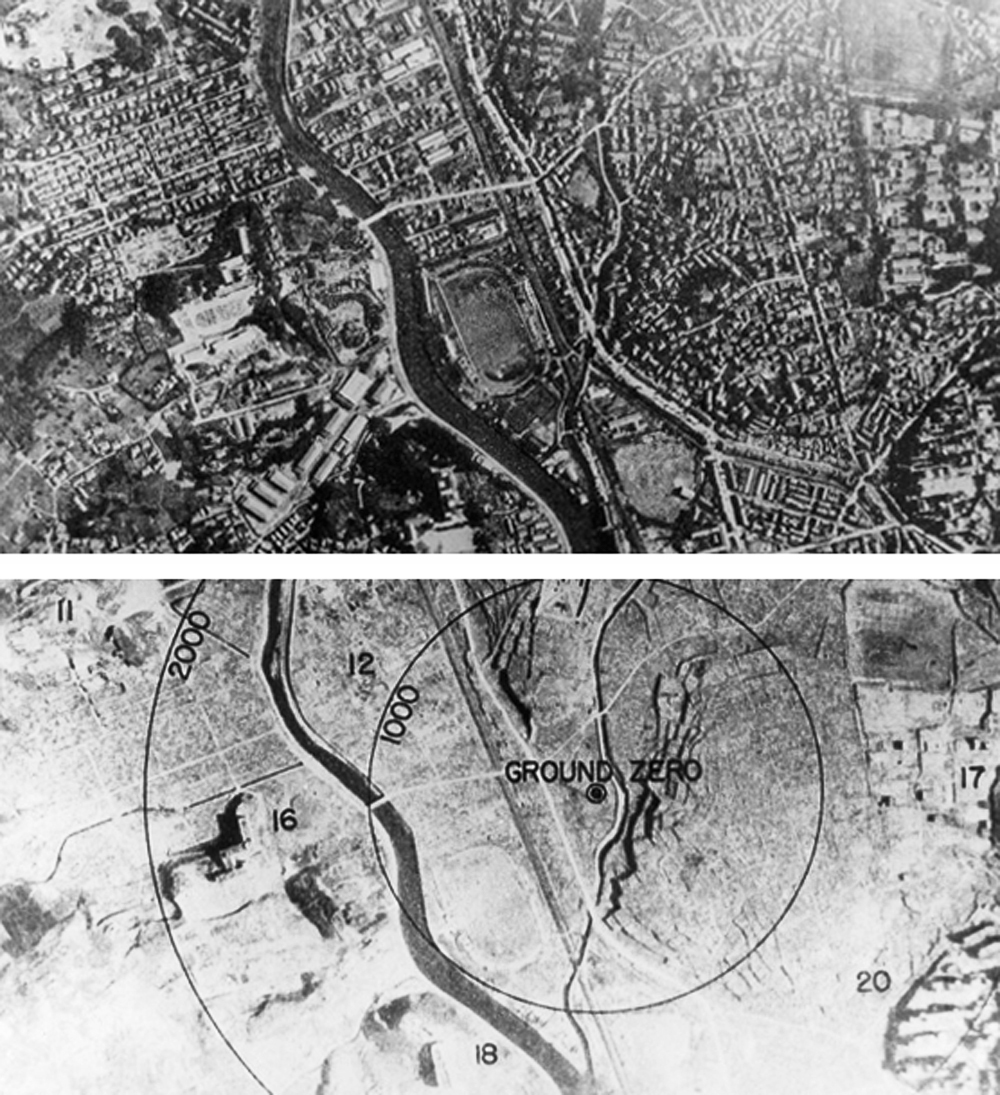
Nagasaki before and after bombing

In the Asiatic-Pacific Theater, Japan continued to bomb Chinese cities and expanded its air operations towards others in Asia such as Singapore, Rangoon and Mandalay. In the first few months of the war with the Western Powers, Japan projected its airpower on settlements as distant as Honolulu, Darwin, and Unalaska. The capture of the Mariana Islands in 1944 enabled the United States Army Air Forces (USAAF) to reach the Japanese home islands using the Boeing B-29 Superfortress.

The United States bombed Tokyo on the night of 9–10 March 1945, killing more than 100,000 people and destroying more than 150,000 buildings, was the most destructive conventional bombing in human history and the deadliest of World War II, known as Operation Meetinghouse. In a few hours, 100,000 people who were in Tokyo, mostly civilians, died either by the bombing or the conflagration that followed the bombing by 325 B-29's night attacks. The bombing was meant to burn wooden buildings and indeed the bombing caused fire that created a 50 m/s wind that is comparable to tornadoes. A total of 381,300 bombs amounting to 1783 tons, were used in the bombing.

US President Harry Truman described the firebombing of Tokyo "was one of the most terrible things that ever happened." Historian Michael Pembroke stated that, "More people were killed, slowly, more agonisingly, than in the atomic bombings of Hiroshima and Nagasaki." One aircrew member of the bombing stream reported that, "At 5,000 feet you could smell the flesh burning. I couldn't eat anything for two or three days ... it was nauseating really.'"

After the successful Operation Meetinghouse raid, the USAAF went on to firebomb other Japanese cities in effort to pulverize the Japanese war industry and shatter Japanese civilian morale. From March to August 1945, the US firebombing of 67 Japanese cities had killed 350,000 civilians. In addition, the atomic bombings of Hiroshima and Nagasaki killed 120,000 civilians.

== Since World War II ==
=== Korean War ===
From 1950 to 1953 during the Korean War, UN air forces led by the United States conducted a heavy bombing campaign against North Korea. For almost three years, from November 1950 to the day the Korean Armistice Agreement was signed on 27 July 1953, the United States Air Force (USAF) under the auspices of the United Nations Command (UNC) conducted large-scale fire bombing and massive fire raids against the major cities of North Korea and North-occupied South Korea, including their respective capital cities—Pyongyang and Seoul. There were also plans to use nuclear weapons against North Korea and the People's Republic of China.

=== Vietnam War ===
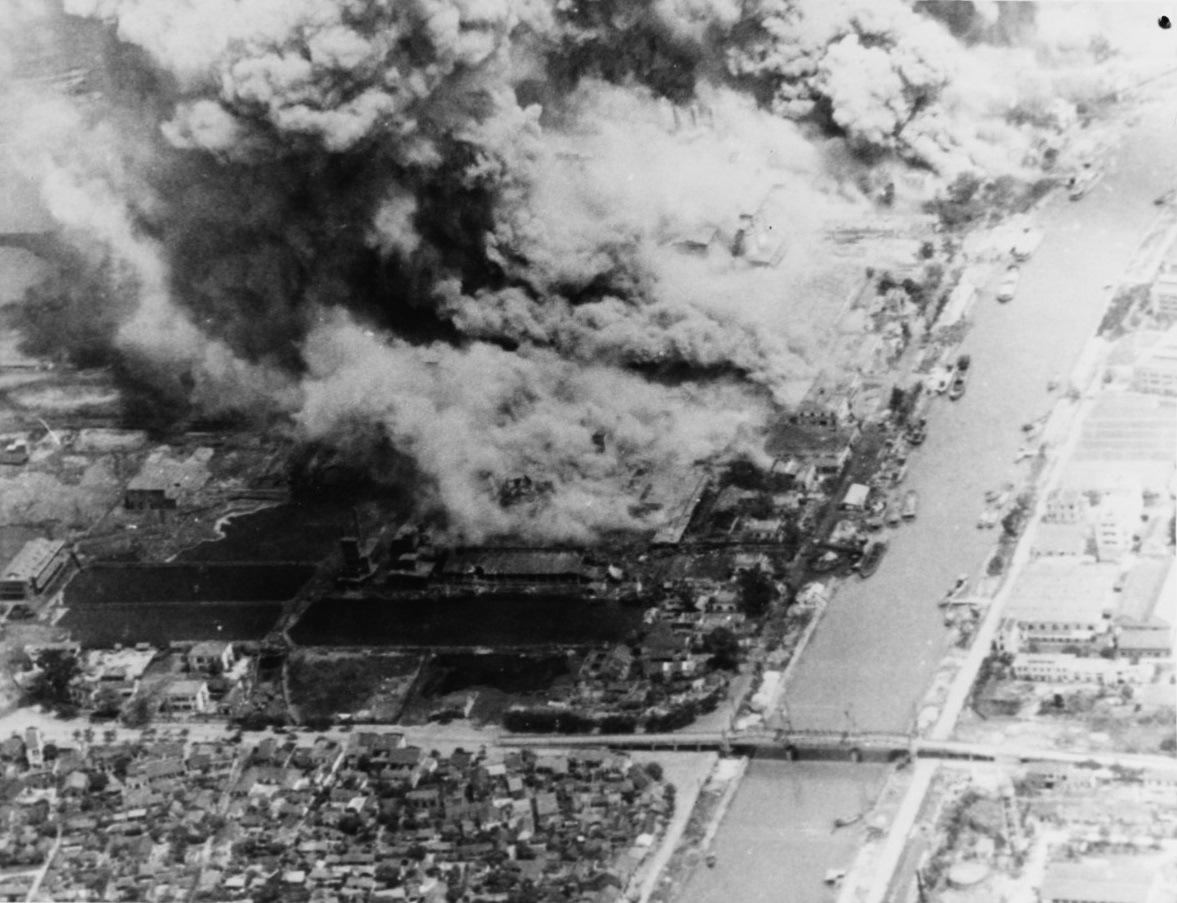
USS Kitty Hawk (CV-63) planes raid the Haiphong cement plant and vicinity, 27 April 1967

From 1965 to 1968 during the Vietnam War, the United States Air Force (USAF) conducted an aerial bombing campaign known as Operation Rolling Thunder. The campaign began with interdiction of supply lines in rural areas of southern North Vietnam but incrementally spread northward throughout the country. In 1966, restrictions against bombing the capital city of Hanoi and the country's largest port, Haiphong, were lifted, and they were bombed by the USAF and US Navy. The bombing of the city centers continued to be prohibited. However, the South Vietnamese cities seized by the communists were bombed, including the former capital of Huế during the 1968 Tet Offensive.

The Republic of Vietnam Air Force bombed contested cities in South Vietnam in 1968, 1972 and 1975, while the Vietnam People's Air Force attacked Southern cities (including the capital city of Saigon) in 1975.

=== Arab-Israeli Conflict ===
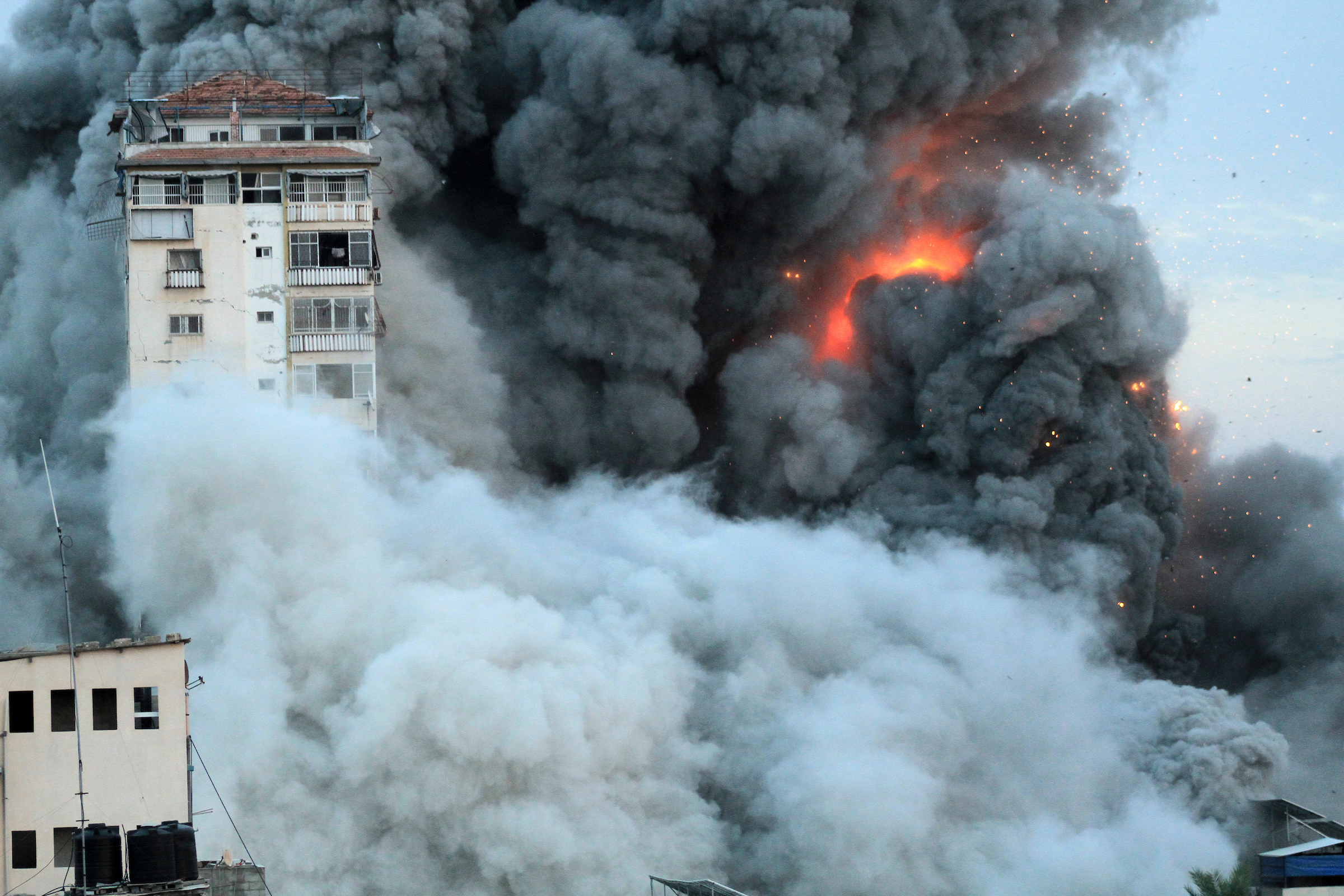
The residential buildings "Palestine Towers" destroyed by Israeli bombing in Gaza City on October 7, 2023 during the Gaza war.

Palestinian cities were bombed by Egyptian, Syrian and Jordanian aircraft during the 1948 Arab-Israeli war and the Six-Day War. The bombing included attacks on some of Palestine's largest cities, such as Tel Aviv, Jerusalem and Haifa. The Lebanese capital of Beirut was attacked by the Israeli aircraft during the Siege of Beirut in 1982, and during the 2006 Lebanon War (using guided munitions). Israel also conducted air strikes targeting Palestinian cities and villages during the Second Intifada, including against Hamas in the Gaza Strip.

=== Wars in Afghanistan ===
In March 1979, in response to an uprising, the Khalq-control army of Democratic Republic of Afghanistan carpet-bombed the Afghanistan's third-largest city of Herat, causing massive destruction and some 5,000 to 25,000 deaths. Herat was also repeatedly bombed during the following Soviet involvement in the Afghan civil war.

Following the September 11, 2001 attacks, the US-led coalition attacked the urban targets in Afghanistan using mainly precision-guided munitions (or "smart bombs"). The United States government maintains that it has a policy of striking only significant combatant targets while doing all possible to avoid what it terms "collateral damage" to civilians and non-combatants during the US-led war in Afghanistan.

=== Iran–Iraq War ===
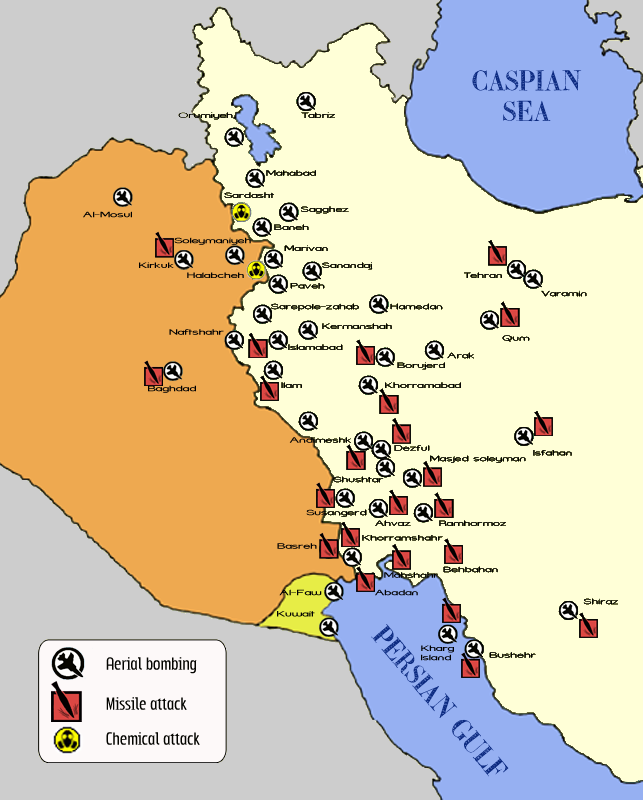
"War of the Cities" during the Iran-Iraq War

Saddam Hussein's Iraq attacked civilian targets in Iranian cities in the War of the Cities during the Iran–Iraq War in the 1980s, with Iranians retaliating in kind (both sides soon switched to ballistic missile attacks). Iraqi aircraft also bombed the Iraqi Kurdistan city of Halabja in 1988 with conventional and chemical weapons in 1988, killing more than 5,000 people in the largest aerial poison gas attack in history.

=== Somalia's campaign against Isaaq ===
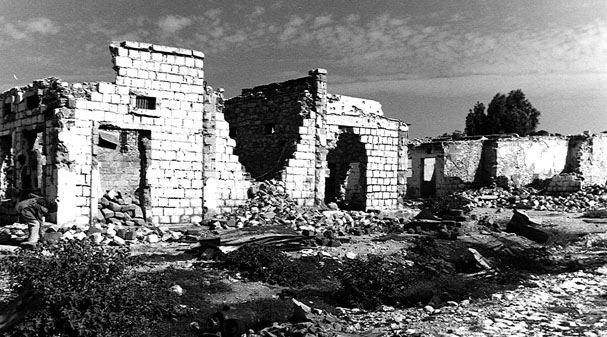
Aftermath of the Somali government's attack on Hargeisa, 90 percent of the city was destroyed.

In 1988 Somali Air Force aircraft conducted intense aerial bombardment of major Isaaq cities targeting civilian Isaaqs during its campaign against Somali National Movement in the north of the country. Civilians were also strafed by Somali Air Force aircraft as they were fleeing the aerial bombardment. The artillery shelling and aerial bombardment caused the deaths of estimated 50,000–200,000 Isaaq civilians, as well as the complete destruction of Somalia's second and third largest cities. It also caused up to 500,000 Somalis (primarily of the Isaaq clan) to flee and cross the border into Hartasheikh in Ethiopia as refugees in what was described as "one of the fastest and largest forced movements of people recorded in Africa", and resulted in the creation of the world's largest refugee camp then (1988), with another 400,000 being internally displaced. The scale of destruction led to Hargeisa being known as the 'Dresden of Africa'.

=== Gulf War ===
The Iraqi Air Force attacked Kuwait City in 1990 and bombed their own cities during the 1991 uprisings in Iraq, targeting civilians with the use of bomb-carrying helicopters (use of airplanes was banned by the Coalition as part of the ceasefire agreement that ended hostilities of the Gulf War but not the war itself).

UN-led coalition aircraft attacked targets in Iraqi cities, including in the capital Baghdad and the largest southern city of Basra during Operation Desert Storm in 1991.

On 13 February 1991, a United States Air Force (USAF) warplane fired two laser-guided missiles at an air raid shelter in the Al-A'amiriya neighborhood of Baghdad, killing at least 408 civilians sheltering there. US officials subsequently claimed that the shelter also served as a communications center for the Iraqi military. BBC correspondent Jeremy Bowen, who was one of the first television reporters on the scene, was given access to the shelter and claimed that he did not find any evidence of it being used by the Iraqi military. His claims were later contradicted by Iraqi general Wafiq al-Samarrai, who claimed that the shelter was used by the Iraqi Intelligence Service, and that Saddam Hussein had personally made visits to it. The day after the bombing of the shelter, a Royal Air Force (RAF) fighter jet fired two laser-guided missiles which were aimed at a bridge in Fallujah which was used as part of an Iraqi military supply line. The missiles malfunctioned and struck Fallujah's largest marketplace (which was situated in a residential area), killing between 50 and 150 non-combatants and wounding many more. After news of the mistake became public, an RAF spokesman, Group Captain David Henderson issued a statement noting that the missile had malfunctioned but admitted that the Royal Air Force had made an error.

=== Yugoslav wars ===
At the beginning of the Yugoslav Wars, in Croatia (1991), the Yugoslav People's Army (JNA) carried out aerial bombing of Dubrovnik and Vukovar.

NATO's aerial bombing of FR Yugoslavia in 1999 included targeted aerial bombing throughout Serbia, notably of targets in Belgrade, Novi Sad and Niš. In addition to military casualties, there were at least 500 civilian casualties. Despite the NATO campaign appearing to violate NATO's charter, the United Nations Security Council (UNSC) rebutted the case on 24 March and 26 March 1999. In addition to purely military targets NATO targeted the national power grid (leaving many cities in the dark), water purification plants, oil refineries, fertilizer factories, and a petrochemical plant in Pancevo. The 78-day bombing campaign is assessed as having been an 'economic catastrophe', cutting the Yugoslav economy in half.

=== Chechen wars ===
Post-Soviet Russia heavily bombed the Chechen capital of Grozny from the air with mostly unguided munitions (including fuel-air explosives) as well as bombarding it with a massive artillery barrages (1994–1995, 1996 and 1999–2000), killing thousands of people (some estimates say 27,000 civilians were killed during the 1994–1995 siege alone), including civilians during the First and Second Chechen Wars. Although the Russian pilots and soldiers were ordered to attack designated targets only, such as the Presidential Palace, due to their inexperience and lack of training, Russian soldiers and pilots bombed and shelled random targets inside the city. In 2003, the UN still called Grozny the most destroyed city on earth.

=== Iraq War ===
In the 2003 Invasion of Iraq, the US-led coalition aircraft again bombed Iraq, including the Shock and Awe campaign of precision bombing of government targets in the city centers. From 2003 to 2011 and 2014 to 2018, coalition aircraft attacked Iraqi insurgent targets, including in urban locations like Najaf, Fallujah, Mosul, Basra and Baghdad. There are frequent reports of civilian casualties, though it is often hard to distinguish guerrillas and civilians.

=== Syria ===
Syrian MiG-23s bombed the city of Aleppo on 24 July 2012, the first use of aerial bombing in the Syrian Civil War. Over the course of the war, the Syrian government has dropped tens of thousands of bombs, mostly unguided barrel bombs, on the cities of Aleppo, Damascus, Homs, Hama, Deir ez-Zor, Hasakah, Daraa, Darayya, and Al-Bab.

=== Russo-Ukrainian War ===
Ever since the beginning of the invasion of Ukraine in 2022, Russia has carried out airstrikes using missiles and drones, often targeting civilian and energy infrastructure. By mid-December, Russia had fired more than 1,000 missiles and drones at Ukraine's energy grid. Several waves targeted Kyiv, including one on 16 May 2023 in which Ukraine said it had intercepted six Kinzhal missiles. Strikes continue into 2025, with the 8/9 July attack launching 728 drones targeting ten out of 23 oblasts, including 50 drones and 5 missiles launched into Lutsk.

=== Gaza war ===
During the Gaza war, Israeli airstrikes damaged or destroyed Palestinian refugee camps, schools, hospitals, mosques, churches, and other civilian infrastructure. By late April 2024 it was estimated that Israel had dropped over 70,000 tons of bombs over Gaza, surpassing the bombing of Dresden, Hamburg, and London combined during World War II.

=== Other conflicts ===
Budapest was attacked by intense Soviet air strikes in 1956 during the Hungarian Revolution. A year before, on 16 June 1955, Casa Rosada, the Argentine government seat at Buenos Aires, was the target of four waves of fighter-bombers during a military uprising to overthrow Juan Perón. Fourteen-tons of bombs scattered on a wide area, killing hundreds of civilian passers-by as well as 11 soldiers. In 2008, the cities of Tskhinvali and Gori were hit by the Georgian and Russian aircraft during the war in Georgia.

== Weapons ==
Weapons such as the USAF's B-36 intercontinental heavy bomber was "designed to bomb its targets from altitudes so high that its strikes would only be accurate enough for 'mass area bombing of urban areas.'"

== International law ==
Air warfare, theoretically, must comply with laws and customs of war, including international humanitarian law by protecting the victims of the conflict and refraining from attacks on protected persons.

These restraints on aerial warfare are covered by the general laws of war, because unlike war on land and at sea—which are specifically covered by rules such as the 1907 Hague Convention and Additional Protocol I to the Geneva Conventions, which contain pertinent restrictions, prohibitions and guidelines—there are no treaties specific to aerial warfare.

To be legal, aerial operations must comply with the principles of humanitarian law: distinction, military necessity, and proportionality: An attack or action must be intended to help in the defeat of the enemy; it must be an attack on a legitimate military objective, and the harm caused to protected civilians or civilian property must be proportionate and not excessive in relation to the concrete and direct military advantage anticipated.

== See also ==
- Area bombardment
- Carpet bombing
- Civilian casualties of strategic bombing
- Indiscriminate attack
- Roerich Pact
- Strategic bombing
- United States Strategic Bombing Survey
- V-2 rocket — the world's first long-range guided ballistic missile to cross the boundary of space, developed in Nazi Germany as a "vengeance weapon"
