= Johann Baptist Ziz =

German botanist (1779–1829)

- Born: October 8, 1779; Mainz, Electorate of Mainz (Holy Roman Empire)
- Died: December 1, 1829; Mainz, Grand Duchy of Hesse
- Education: Chemical-Pharmaceutical Institute, Erfurt; Collegium medico-chirurgicum, Berlin
- Known for: Genus Zizia; Botanisches Findbuch
- Notable work: Botanisches Findbuch (1810–1829)
- Scientific career
- Fields: Botany, Pharmacy, Natural Sciences
- Workplaces: Mainz Gymnasium
- Author abbrev. (botany): Ziz

Johann Baptist Ziz (8 October 1779–1 December 1829) was a German botanist, apothecary, and teacher of natural sciences at the Mainz gymnasium. He devoted himself to botanical studies, undertaking field trips across Germany and as far as southern France and the Pyrenees, and compiled a 170-page handwritten botanical notebook documenting the flora of Rheinhessen, the Rheingau, and the Lower Nahe, which remains a valuable primary source despite the destruction of his herbarium during the 1944 air raids on Darmstadt.

== Early life and career ==
Johann Baptist Ziz was born on 8 October 1779 in Mainz, the eldest son of the wine merchant Melchior Ziz and Anna Maria Froelich. After schooling in French‑occupied Mainz, he served his pharmacy apprenticeship at the Pfau‑Apotheke under Philipp Martin Baymer, completing his journeyman's examination in 1799. He then studied at the Chemical‑Pharmaceutical Institute in Erfurt (1799–1801) and attended lectures in chemistry and physics at the Collegium medico‑chirurgicum in Berlin. Over the next decade he worked in apothecaries at Kassel, Frankfurt and Darmstadt, finally returning to Mainz in 1812 to qualify as an apothecary and settle as a private scholar. Supported by independent means, Ziz devoted himself to botany, undertaking field trips as far afield as southern France and the Pyrenees. In 1819 he was appointed teacher of natural sciences at the Mainz gymnasium, later adding the titles Medizinalrat and Professor. Although he published only one small botanical note (on the Sirona spa, Nierstein, 1827), his contemporaries honoured him by naming the genus Zizia in his memory. Ziz died unmarried on 1 December 1829 in Mainz; his extensive herbarium was bequeathed to the Grand Ducal Museum in Darmstadt but was destroyed during the 1944 air raids.

== Botanisches Findbuch ==
Between about 1810 and 1829 Ziz compiled a 170‑page handwritten "botanical notebook" (Findbuch) covering the wild plants of Rheinhessen, the Rheingau and the Lower Nahe. Now preserved in the Stadtbibliothek Mainz (Hs III 101), it is organised in Linnaean classes I–XXIII, with each genus and species numbered consecutively. For each entry Ziz recorded vernacular French names, precise collection localities—often his own discoveries—and the number of specimens he dried, marking rarities with red symbols. A bound insert of June 1829 records an excursion to the Wiesbaden area. Although Ziz's original herbarium perished in 1944, his Findbuch remains a primary source for the early 19th‑century flora of Hesse.
