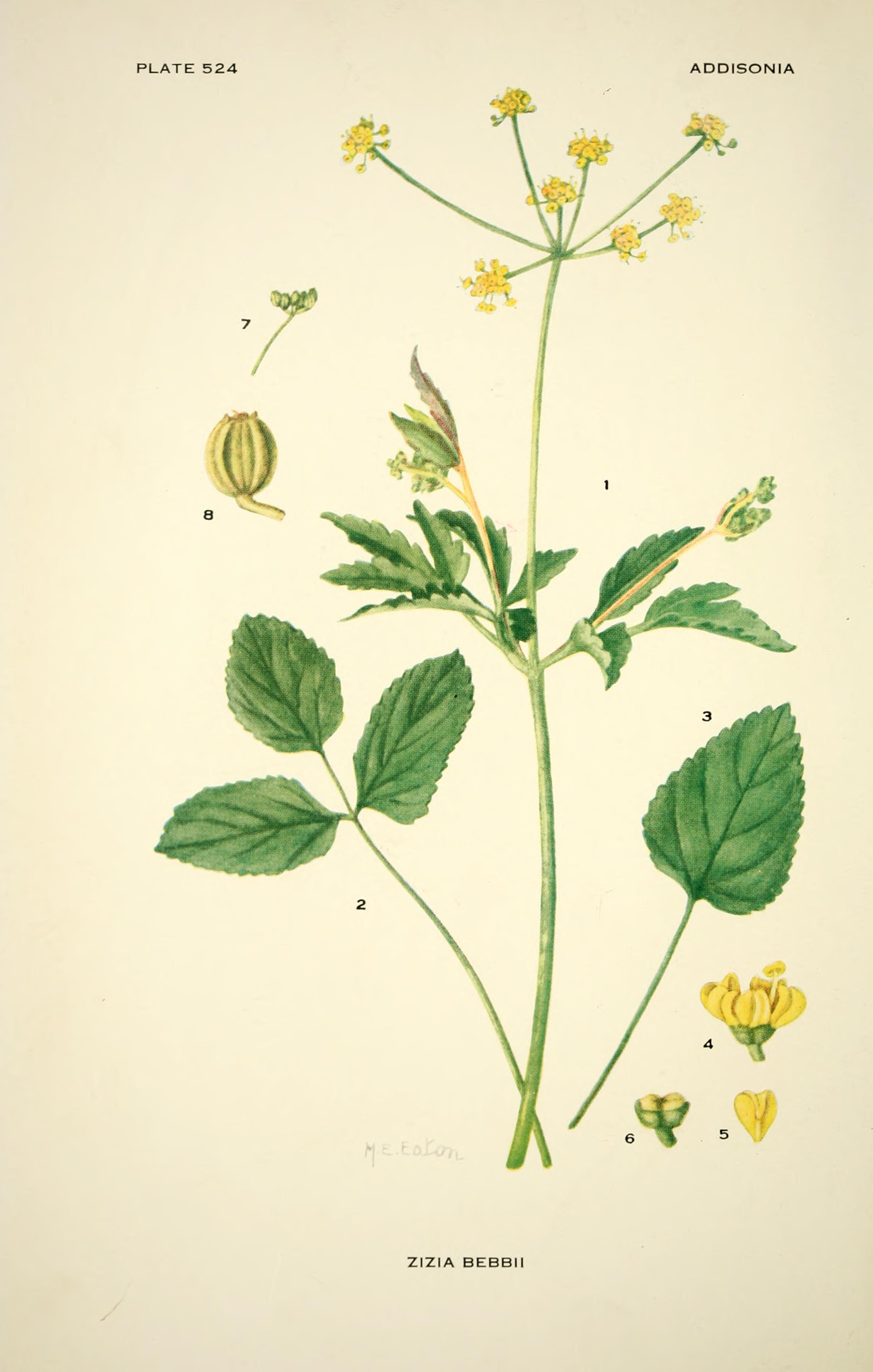
- Illustration of Zizia trifoliata

Scientific classification
- Kingdom: Plantae
- Clade: Tracheophytes
- Clade: Angiosperms
- Clade: Eudicots
- Clade: Asterids
- Order: Apiales
- Family: Apiaceae
- Genus: Zizia
- Species: Z. trifoliata

Binomial name
- Zizia trifoliata (Michx.) Fernald (1940)

Synonyms
- Sison trifoliatum Michx. (1803); Sium trifoliatum Poir (1811); Zizia arenicola Rose (1905); Zizia aurea var. bebbii J.M.Coult. & Rose (1887); Zizia bebbii (J.M.Coult. & Rose) Britton (1890); Zizia latifolia Small (1933)

= Zizia trifoliata =

Meadow alexanders

Species of plant

Zizia trifoliata, known by the common name of meadow alexanders, is a member of the carrot family, Apiaceae. It is a perennial herb, native primarily to the Appalachian Mountains in the southeastern United States, but is less commonly found throughout Georgia, Florida, Alabama, and Arkansas.
