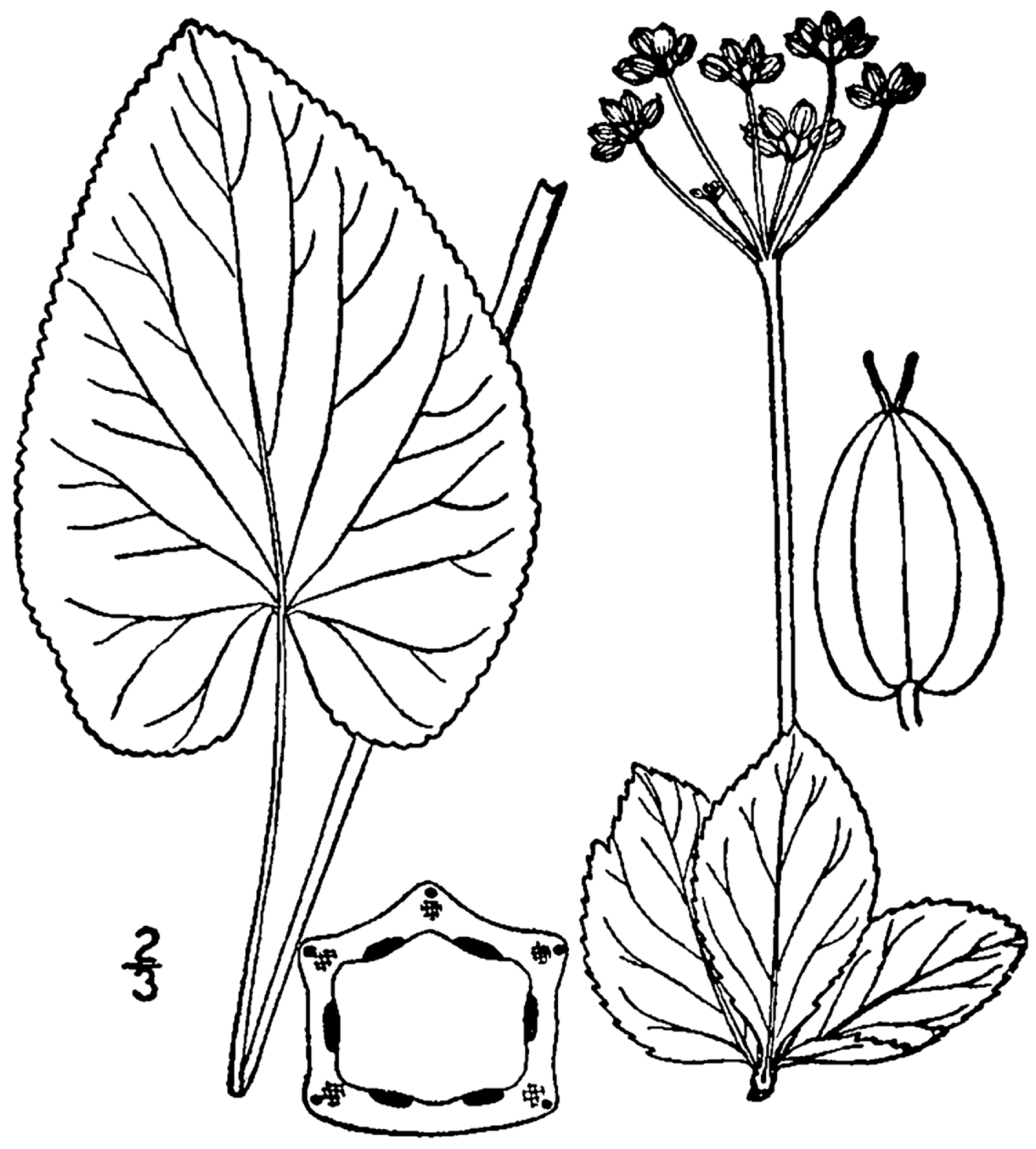
- Botanical illustration
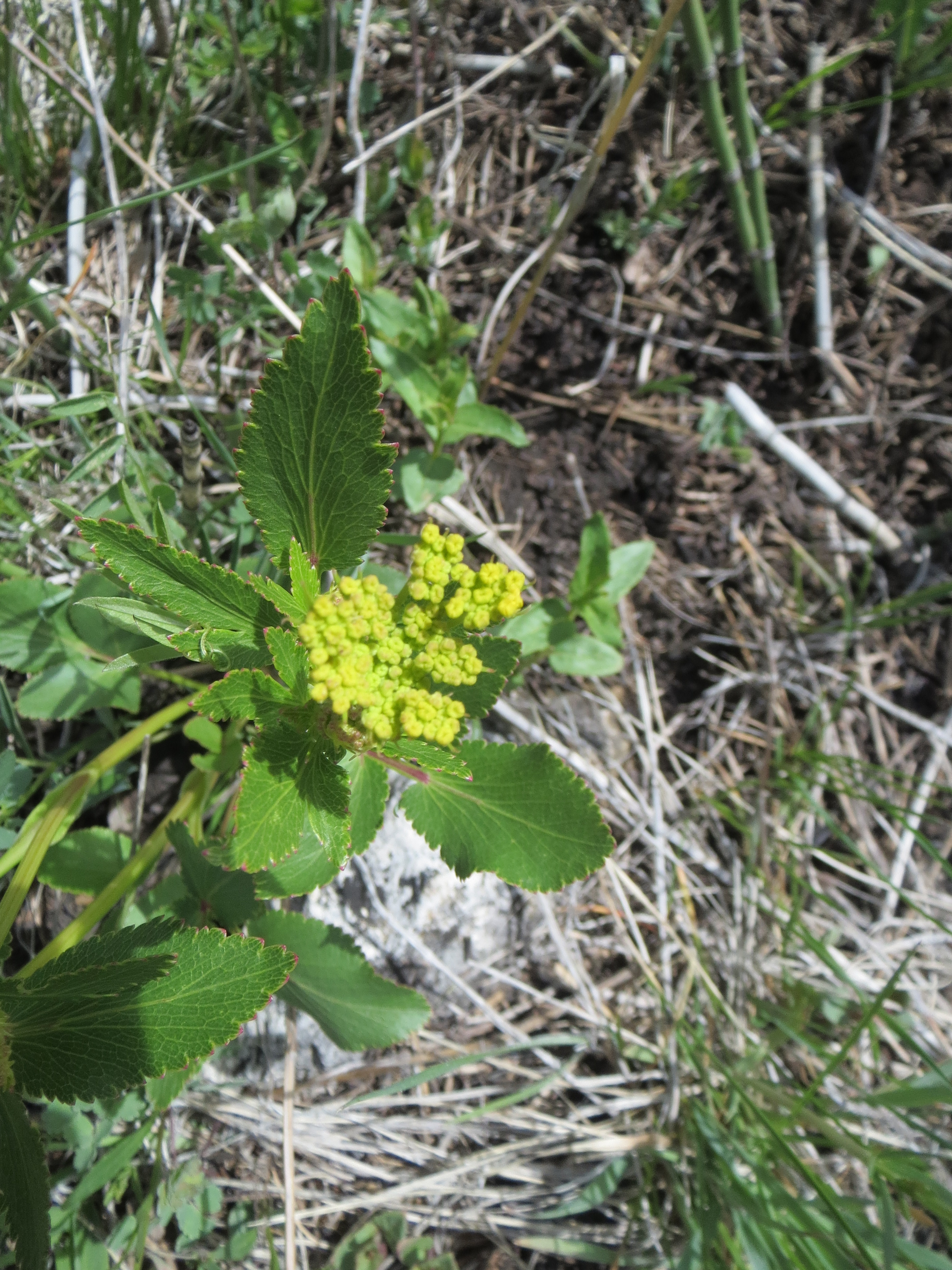
- Zizia aptera in bud

Conservation status
- Secure (NatureServe)

Scientific classification
- Kingdom: Plantae
- Clade: Tracheophytes
- Clade: Angiosperms
- Clade: Eudicots
- Clade: Asterids
- Order: Apiales
- Family: Apiaceae
- Genus: Zizia
- Species: Z. aptera

Binomial name
- Zizia aptera (A.Gray) Fernald (1939)

Synonyms
- Thaspium trifoliatum var. apterum A.Gray (1856); Thaspium cordatum Torr. & A.Gray (1840); Zizia aptera var. occidentalis Fernald (1939); Zizia cordata W.D.J.Koch ex DC. (1830)

= Zizia aptera =

Species of flowering plant

Zizia aptera is a flowering plant native to North America. Its common names include meadow zizia, golden alexanders, heart leaved golden alexanders, and prairie golden alexanders.

== Description ==
The leaves are 2.5–10 centimetres (1–4 inches) long, ovate and indented at the base, with jagged edges; the upper leaves are divided into three segments. Compound umbels of yellow flowers bloom atop the stems from May to July. The fruits are elliptical.

== Distribution and habitat ==
Zizia aptera can be found throughout southern Canada and much of the continental United States, though it is absent in the Southwest, the southern Great Plains, and New England. It inhabits wet areas.

== Conservation ==
Zizia aptera is listed as endangered in Connecticut, as rare in Indiana, as threatened in Michigan, and as "historical" (extirpated) in Rhode Island.
