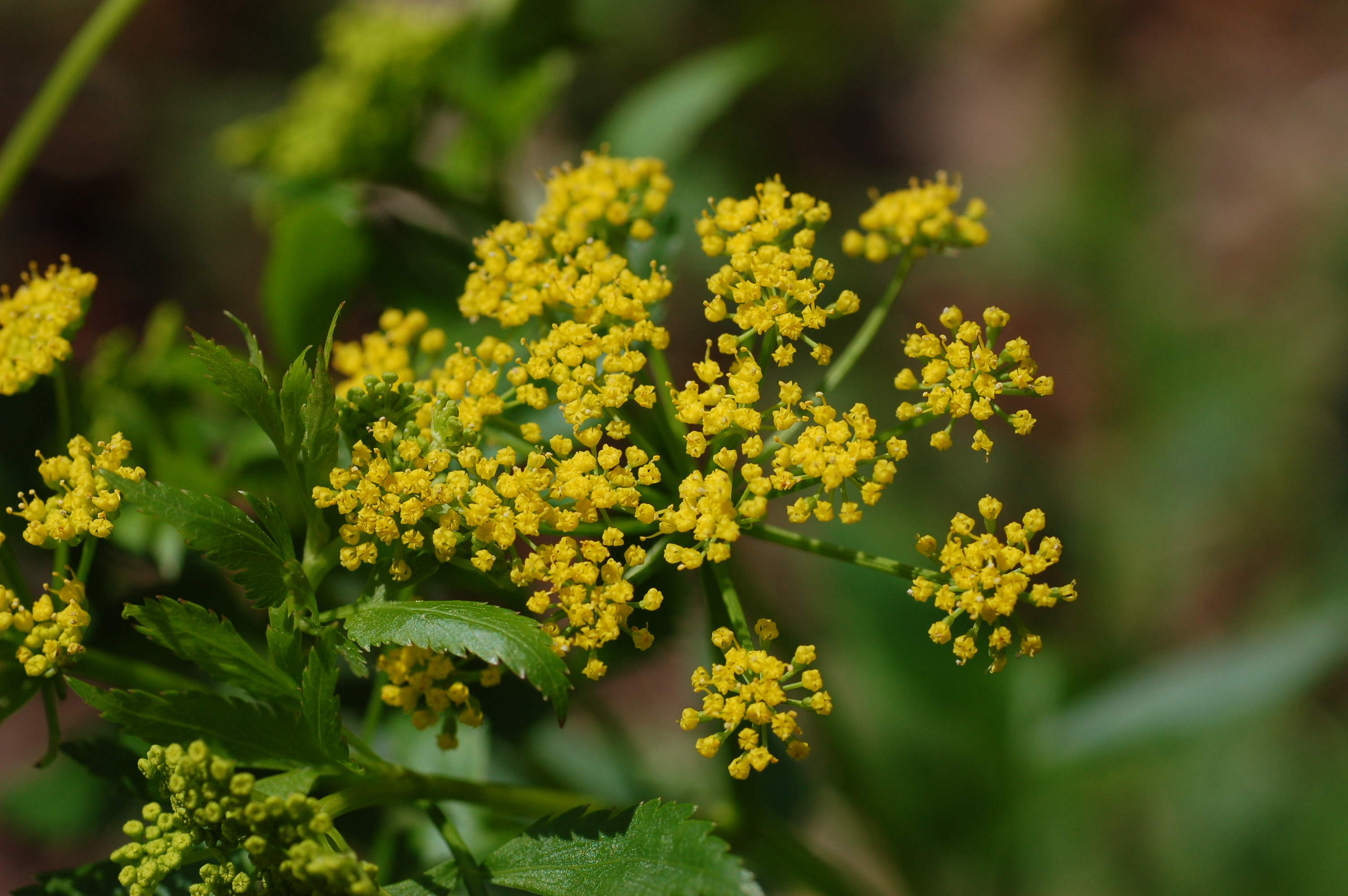
- Zizia aurea

Scientific classification
- Kingdom: Plantae
- Clade: Tracheophytes
- Clade: Angiosperms
- Clade: Eudicots
- Clade: Asterids
- Order: Apiales
- Family: Apiaceae
- Subfamily: Apioideae
- Tribe: Selineae
- Genus: Zizia; W.D.J.Koch
- State-level distribution of Zizia in the United States

= Zizia =

Genus of flowering plants

Zizia is a genus of flowering plants in the parsley family, Apiaceae. It was named after Johann Baptist Ziz (1779–1829), a German botanist from the Rhineland. It is native to North America.

Like most other plants in the family, these produce compound umbels of flowers.

Species include:

- Zizia aptera (A. Gray) Fernald – heartleaf alexanders, meadowparsnip, meadow zizia
- Zizia aurea (L.) W.D.J. Koch – golden alexanders, golden zizia
- Zizia trifoliata (Michx.) Fernald – meadow alexanders
