= Bombing of Belgrade in World War II =

The bombing of Belgrade in World War II may refer to:

- The bombing of Belgrade in 1941, part of the Axis invasion of Yugoslavia
- The bombing of Belgrade in 1944, part of the Allied bombing campaign
