= Niš cluster bombing =

1999 bombings in Serbia

Cluster bombing of Niš
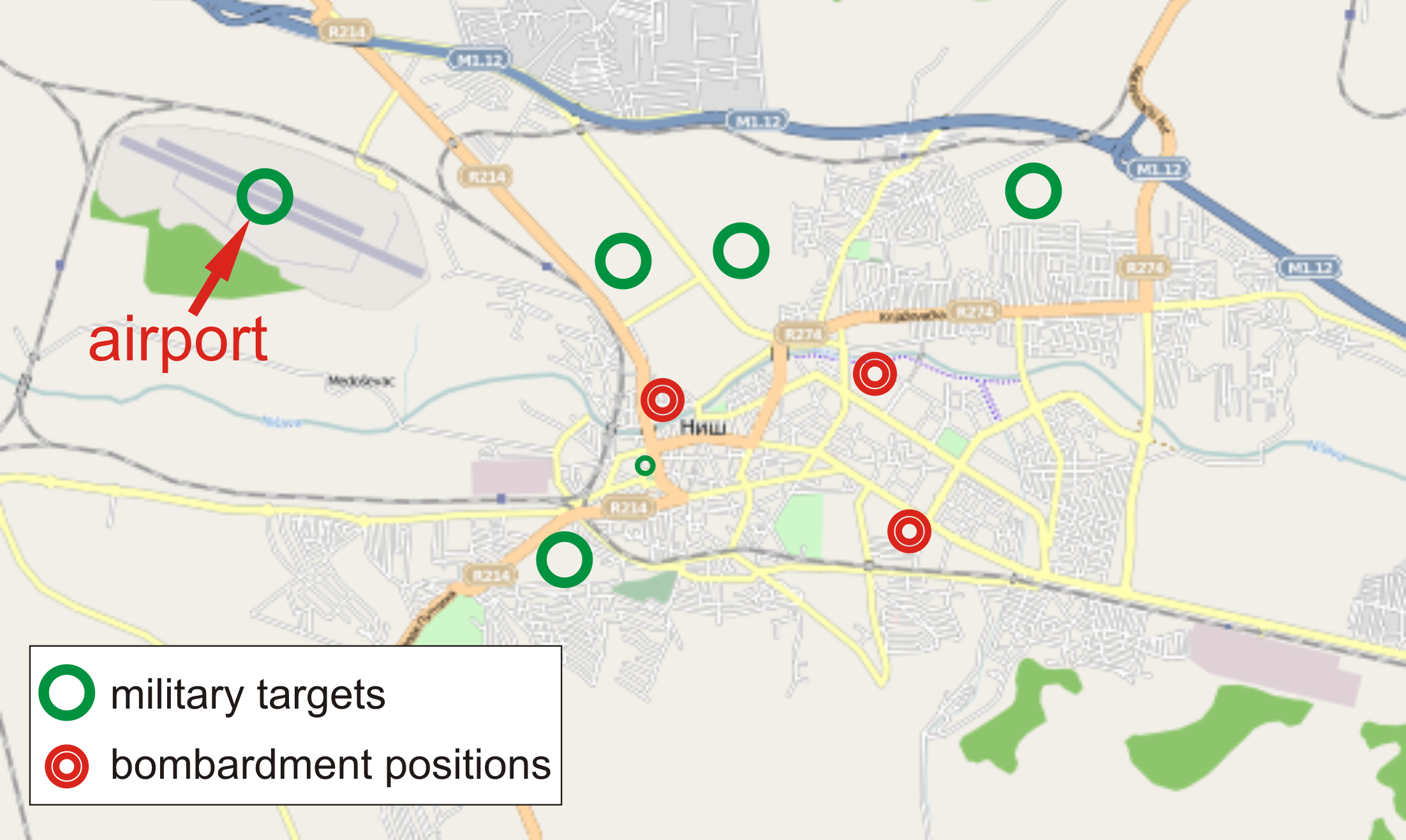
- Location of bombsites on 7 May 1999, relative to their intended targets
- Location: Niš, Serbia, Yugoslavia
- Date: 7 May 1999, 12 May 1999
- Target: Niš Airport
- Attack type: Aerial bombing
- Deaths: 14 to 16
- Injuries: 28 on first attack, 11 on second attack
- Perpetrator: Netherlands Air Force

The cluster bombings of Niš were events that occurred on 7 and 12 May 1999 during the coalition-led bombing of Yugoslavia. The first bombing was a significant event involving civilian deaths and the use of cluster bombs during the NATO campaign in Yugoslavia.

== The first bombing ==
On 7 May 1999, between the time of 11:30 and 11:40, fighter jets of the Royal Netherlands Air Force dropped two containers of cluster bombs over Niš, directed at Niš Airport, located at the end of the city. The bombs impacted near the city center, which is at least 3 km from the airport, their presumed target. The bombs were scattered from the two containers and were carried by the wind and then fell in three locations in the central part of the city:

- The Pathology building next to the Medical Center of Niš in the south of the city,
- Next to the building of "Banovina" including the main market, bus station next to the Niš Fortress and "12th February" Health Centre
- Parking of "Niš Express" near the Nišava River.

A report from Human Rights Watch recorded 14 civilians deaths as a result of the attack, with another 28 injured. Večernje novosti reported 16 civilian deaths. Civilian deaths were high as the attack occurred in the middle of the day when civilians were congregating in the streets and at the market where the death toll was greatest.

== The second bombing ==
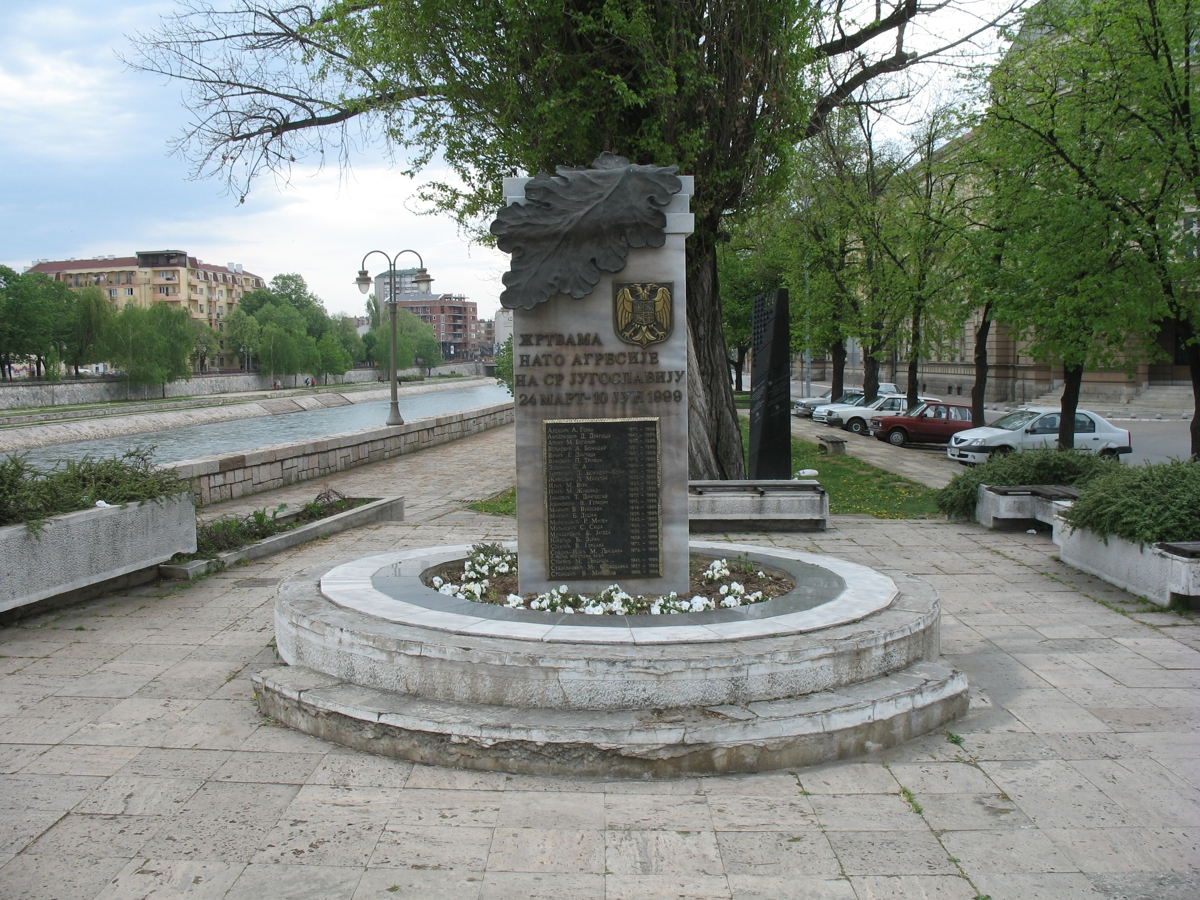
Monument to victims of the bombing of Niš

On 12 May 1999, the eastern part of the city was bombed with cluster bombs, resulting in 11 civilian injuries. Many of the injuries were amputations. This part of the city, Duvanište, is more than 7 km from the airport. The most recent victim of that bombing was killed in the year 2000, when an unexploded bomb detonated.

== Aftermath ==
After the incident the Royal Netherlands Air Force stopped using cluster bombs in the campaign, but other NATO members continued to use them. According to a report issued by Amnesty International, NATO gave no reason as to why cluster munitions were deployed on targets so close to a civilian population. In their opinion, NATO violated Article 51(4) and (5) of Protocol I.

In 2009 hundreds of unexploded cluster munitions could still be found in the Serbian countryside, despite efforts by the Serbian government to clear all sites of such munitions.
