= Bombing of Mandalay =

WWII aerial bombardment in British Burma

Coordinates: 21°58′52.8″N 96°05′02.7″E

Bombing of Mandalay (1942)
- Part of Pacific War
Date	1942
Location	Mandalay, British Burma

Belligerents
British Empire: (British Raj) British India; (Myanmar) British Burma	Empire of Japan

Casualties and losses
~2,000 civilians killed and ~60% of city destroyed on 3 April 1942 raid	unknown

The bombing of Mandalay was conducted as part of the Japanese conquest of Burma and was one of many Burmese cities, towns, and ports subject to air raids by the Imperial Japanese Army Air Service during the Pacific theater of World War II.

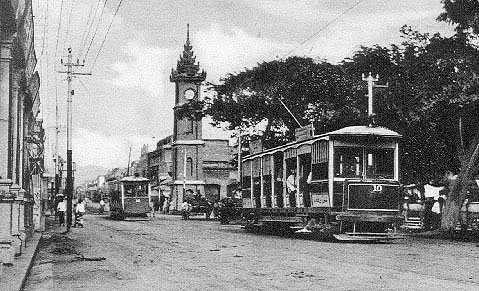
Mandalay tramway before the bombing.

Mandalay suffered its first air raid on February 19, 1942, when Japanese bombers attacked the city. Later on, the city suffered one of the most devastating air raids on April 3, 1942. That night, Japanese bombers dropped incendiary bombs, creating a huge firestorm. About three-fifths of the wooden houses and the former homes of Burmese kings was destroyed, and an estimated 2,000 civilians killed.The official Royal Air Force history described the raid as "particularly devastating" because the firefighting equipment was destroyed and that "thousands" of the inhabitants perished. It was said that a city that had taken a thousand years to build was destroyed in an hour. Clare Boothe Luce, the wife of Henry Luce, publisher of Time and Life magazines, and then a reporter in Burma, visited Mandalay two days later after the bombing. She wrote:

Every house was burned down or still flaming and smoldering. A terrible stink arose from 2,000 bodies in the ruins of brick, plaster and twisted tin roofing. Only the smoke-grimed stone temple elephants on the scarred path were watching guard over the Road to Mandalay, while buzzards and carrion crows wheeled overhead. Bodies were lying on the streets and bobbing like rotten apples in the quiet green moat around the untouched fort.

== Hommage ==
The British band Echo and the Bunnymen commemorated this event in their song Bombers Bay in the 1987 album Echo and the Bunnymen.

== See also ==
- Civilian casualties
- Civilian casualties of strategic bombing
- Firebombing
