= Medizinalrat (GDR) =

Honorary title

Medizinalrat (MR), also Obermedizinalrat (OMR), was an honorary title in the GDR for honoured physicians and dentists. It was awarded every year on 11 December, the birthday of Robert Koch.

== Sources ==
- Verordnung über die Verleihung der Titel "Sanitätsrat", "Pharmazierat", "Medizinalrat", "Oberpharmazierat" und "Obermedizinalrat", 20 December 1972 (GBl. 1973 I S. 1)
- Anordnung über die Verleihung der Titel Medizinalrat, Pharmazierat, Sanitätsrat, Obermedizinalrat und Oberpharmazierat, 1st of june 1978 (GBl. I S. 239); changed Anordnung Nr. 2 (28. November 1988) im Gesetzblatt der Deutschen Demokratischen Republik 1989, S. 27
