= Bombing of Darmstadt in World War II =

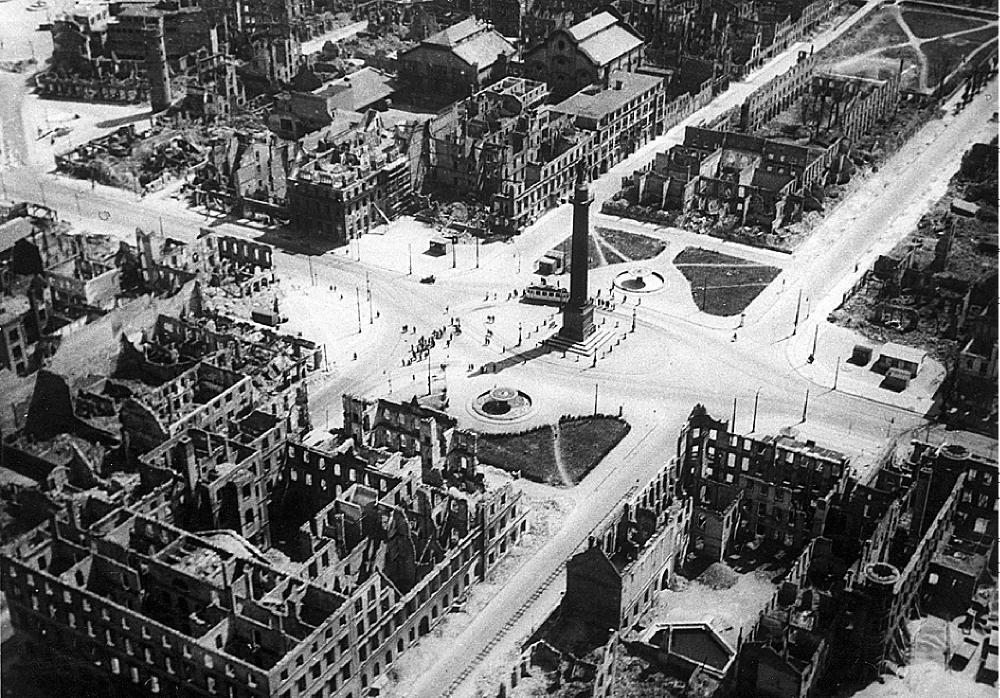
Luisenplaza in the Darmstadt city centre after the bombing raid

Darmstadt was bombed a number of times during World War II. The most devastating air raid on Darmstadt occurred during the night of 11/12 September 1944, when No. 5 Group of the Royal Air Force (RAF) bombed the city killing over 11,000 of the city's 110,000 inhabitants and making more than 65,000 homeless. Darmstadt had several major industrial targets including Merck and Rohm and Haas chemical works, as well as military communications networks.

== Minor raids ==
During the night of 23/24 September 1943, Darmstadt was bombed by 21 Avro Lancasters and 8 De Havilland Mosquitos of No. 8 Group RAF as a diversionary raid to draw night fighters away from the main 628-aircraft raid on Mannheim.

During the night of 24/25 April 1944, some RAF planes bombed Darmstadt and other towns when, due to low cloud, they failed to find the main target of the night which was Karlsruhe.

An attack during the night of 25/26 August 1944 by No. 5 Group RAF failed when the Master Bomber had to return to base and his deputies were shot down en route. The pathfinder "Illuminating Force" flares fell too far west. As a result, most of the main force did not bomb at all, with some diverting to bomb Rüsselsheim instead. The few bombs which hit the town hit 95 buildings and killed eight people.

Following the main raids another diversionary raid by four Mosquitos was made during the night of 23/24 February 1945 to draw night fighters away from the main target of Pforzheim.

== Major raids ==
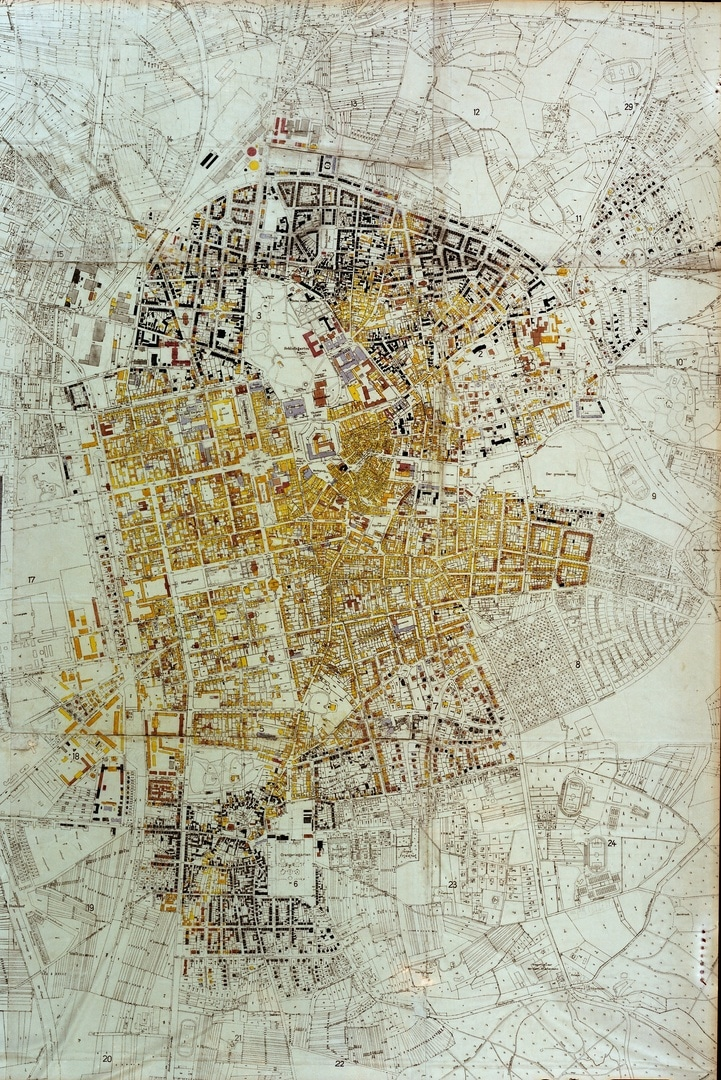
Destruction of Darmstadt during World War II depicted in black (0–3 percent), gray (4–9 percent), red (10–24 percent), blue-violet (25–49 percent), brown (50–69 percent), orange (70–84 percent), and yellow (85–100 percent)

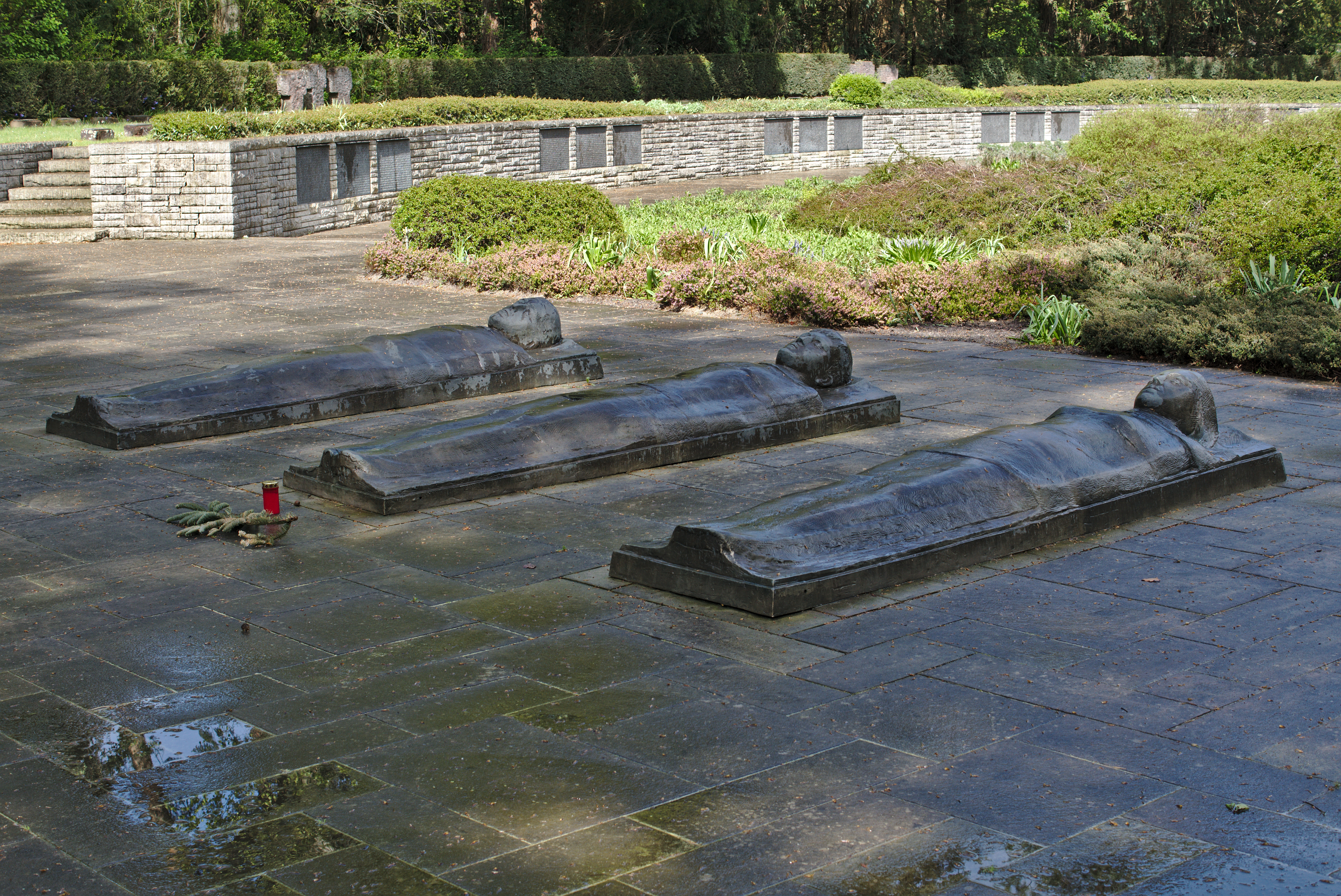
War memorial at Waldfriedhof Darmstadt ('forest cemetery Darmstadt')

The worst raid on Darmstadt was by No. 5 Group RAF during the night of the 11/12 September 1944, when 226 Lancasters and 14 Mosquitos were directed to the medieval city centre, as houses there were mainly built of wood. The raid was to incorporate a new technique where, instead of bombers flying along a single path across the target, the bombers would bomb along a fan of paths over the city. The intention was to deliberately spread the bombload, in this attack comprising 191 aerial mines, 33 high-explosive bombs and 285,848 incendiary bombs. The attack started a fierce fire in the city centre and in the districts immediately to the south and east. The destruction of dwellings in this area was almost complete. The RAF lost 12 Lancasters, 5.3 percent of the bomber force, having encountered an unusually large number of German fighters.

Royal Air Force Bomber Command 60th Anniversary Campaign Diary for September 1944 states:

The Darmstadt raid, with its extensive fire destruction and its heavy casualties, was held by the Germans to be an extreme example of RAF 'terror bombing' and remains a sensitive subject because of the claimed absence of any major industries in the city. Bomber Command defended the raid by pointing out the railway communications passing through Darmstadt; the directive for the offensive against German communications had not yet been issued to Bomber Command, although advance notice of the directive may have been received. Darmstadt was simply one of Germany's medium-sized cities of lesser importance which succumbed to Bomber Command's improving area-attack techniques in the last months of the war when many of the larger cities were no longer worth bombing.

This air raid is referred to colloquially as Brandnacht (lit. 'fire-night'), because the massive use of incendiary bombs triggered a devastating firestorm that almost completely destroyed large parts of the city, especially the old town. Many of the over 11,000 victims suffocated in their air raid shelters or were sucked into the flames, a fifth of which were children. The calligraphic memorial Darmstädter Brandnamen lists about 4,000 names.

Post-strike aerial photographs of Darmstadt taken 12 September 1944
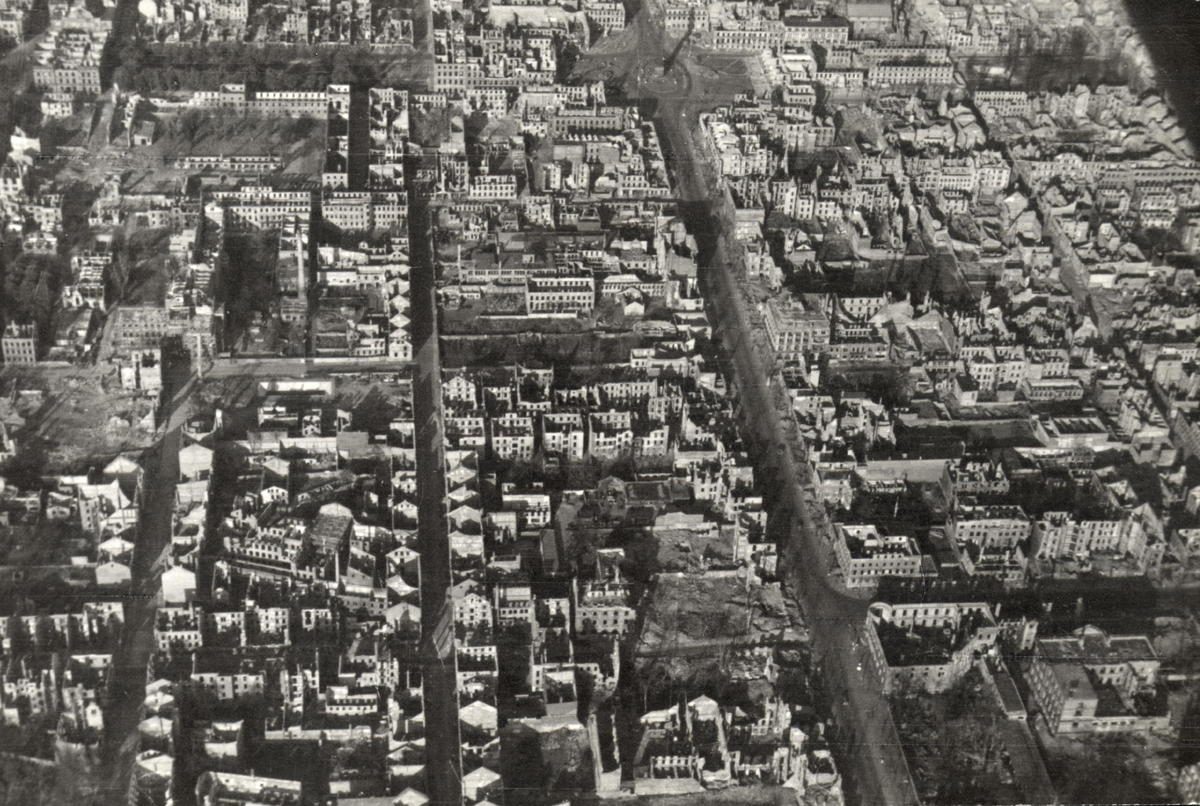
Western part

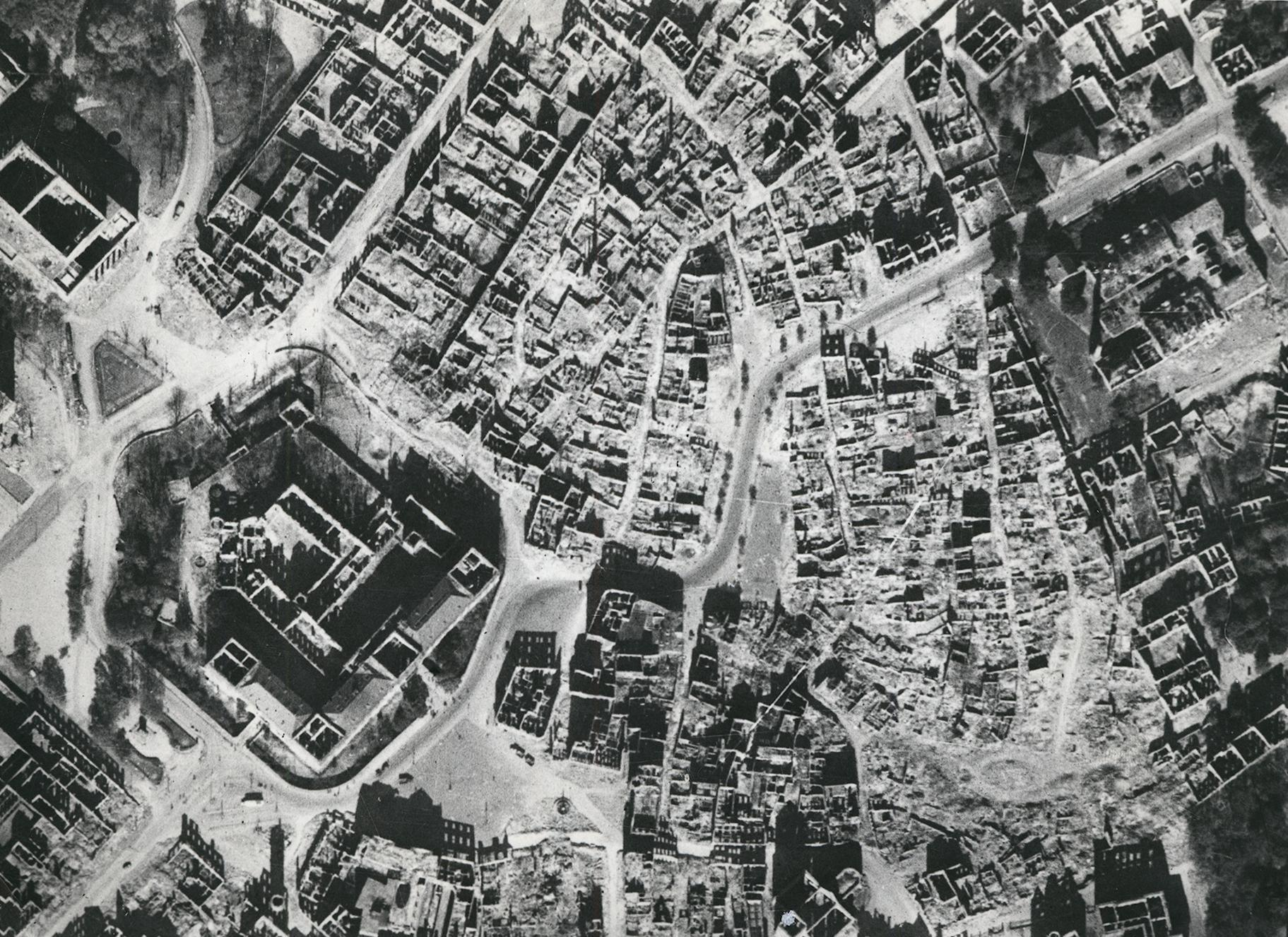
Old town and residential palace

The largest air raid on Darmstadt by the US Air Force was at midday on 12 December 1944 with 458 aircraft dropping 4,128 high-explosive 230-kilogram (500 lb) bombs and over 200 tonnes (440,000 lb) of incendiary bombs. Targets were the railway facilities and industrial plants in the north of the city.

Among industries in Darmstadt, the Rohm and Haas chemical works was destroyed, the E. Merck chemical works was badly damaged, and additional damage resulted in a loss of production of about one month's work by the local metal production and fabrication industry.

== Sources ==
- "Schriftkunst-Mahnmal im Weißen Turm" [Writing Art Memorial in the White Tower]. Echo (in German). 17 December 2014. Archived from the original on 30 December 2014.
- Hastings, Max (2013). Bomber Command. Zenith Press. ISBN 978-0-7603-4520-7.
- "Corporate History: Krieg und Frieden" [Corporate History: War and Peace]. Merck (in German). 2025.
- Royal Air Force (1943). September 1943. Campaign Diary. Royal Air Force. Wikidata Q131325374. Archived from the original on 6 July 2007.
- Royal Air Force (1944a). April 1944. Campaign Diary. Royal Air Force. Wikidata Q131326451. Archived from the original on 6 July 2007.
- Royal Air Force (1944b). August 1944. Campaign Diary. Royal Air Force. Wikidata Q131327223. Archived from the original on 6 July 2007.
- Royal Air Force (1944c). September 1944. Campaign Diary. Royal Air Force. Wikidata Q131327835. Archived from the original on 6 July 2007.
- Royal Air Force (1945). February 1945. Campaign Diary. Royal Air Force. Wikidata Q131341956. Archived from the original on 6 July 2007.
- Heidenreich, Bernd; Neitzel, Sönke, eds. (2004). Der Bombenkrieg und seine Opfer [The Bombing War and its Victims] (PDF). POLIS (in German). Vol. 39. Wiesbaden: Hessische Landeszentrale für politische Bildung. ISBN 3-927127-56-6.
- "Wissenschaftsstadt Darmstadt gedenkt am 11.9 den Opfern der Brandnacht vor 81 Jahren" [Darmstadt City of Science commemorates the victims of the fire-night 81 years ago on September 11]. Wissenschaftsstadt Darmstadt (in German). 9 September 2025.
- Engels, Peter (2004). "Brandnacht" [Fire-night]. Darmstadt Stadtlexikon (in German).
