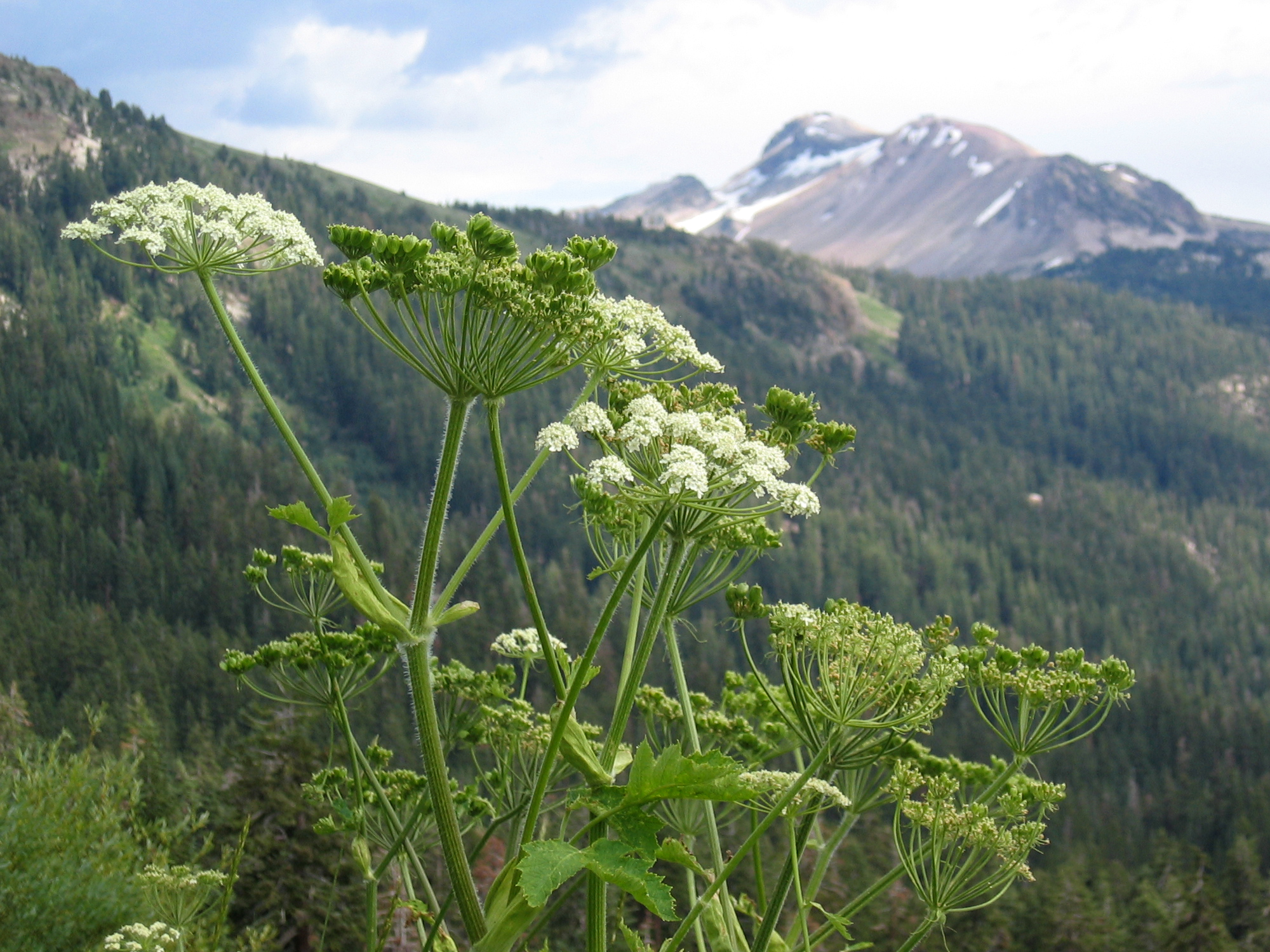
- Heracleum maximum growing wild in the Sierra Nevada mountains, California

Conservation status
- Least Concern (IUCN 3.1)

Scientific classification
- Kingdom: Plantae
- Clade: Tracheophytes
- Clade: Angiosperms
- Clade: Eudicots
- Clade: Asterids
- Order: Apiales
- Family: Apiaceae
- Genus: Heracleum
- Species: H. maximum

Binomial name
- Heracleum maximum W.Bartram

Synonyms
- See text

= Heracleum maximum =

Species of flowering plant

Heracleum maximum, commonly known as cow parsnip, is the only member of the genus Heracleum native to North America. It is also known as American cow-parsnip, Satan celery, Indian celery, Indian rhubarb, poison turnip or pushki.

== Description ==
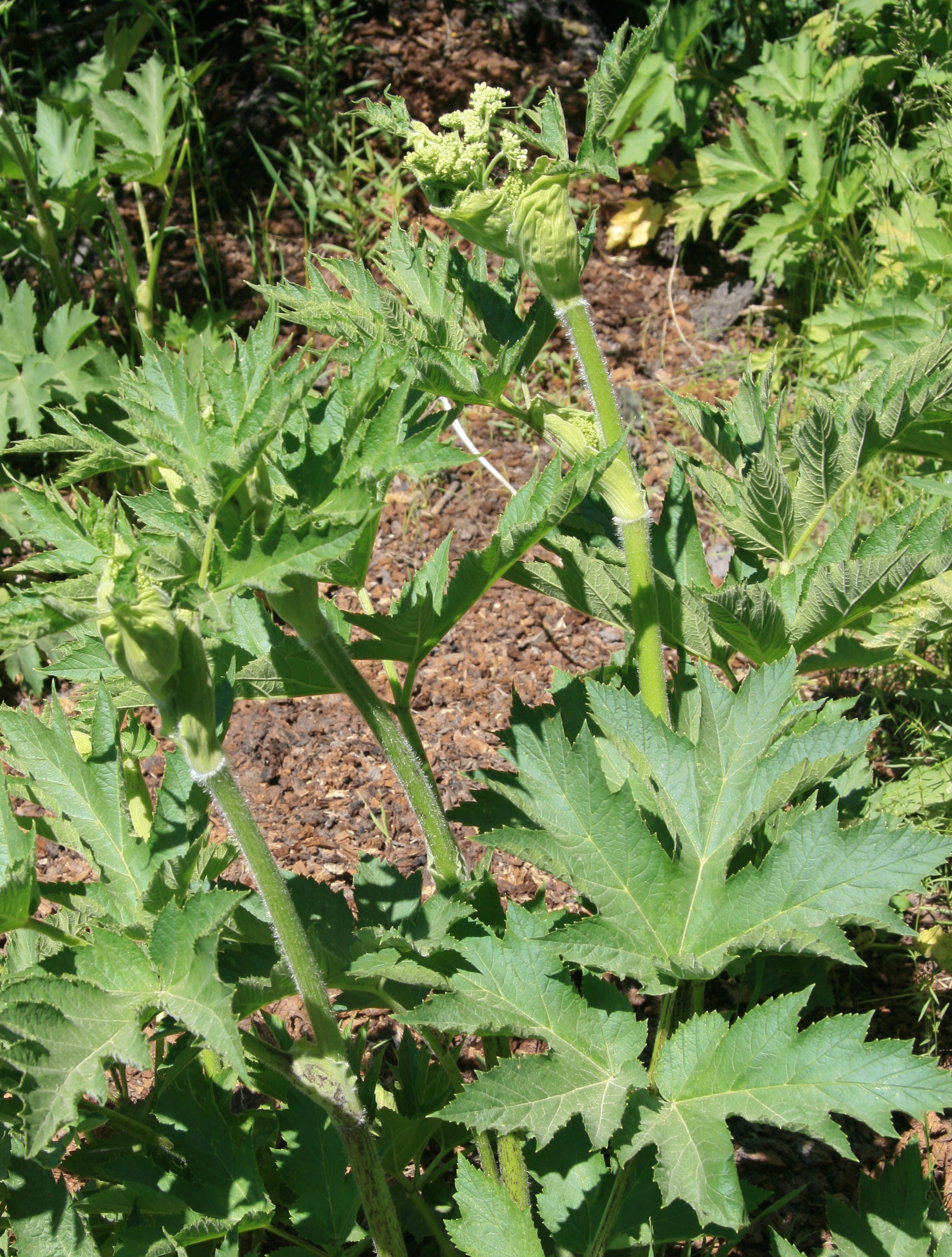
The leaves are up to 40 cm (16 in) across and divided into lobes.

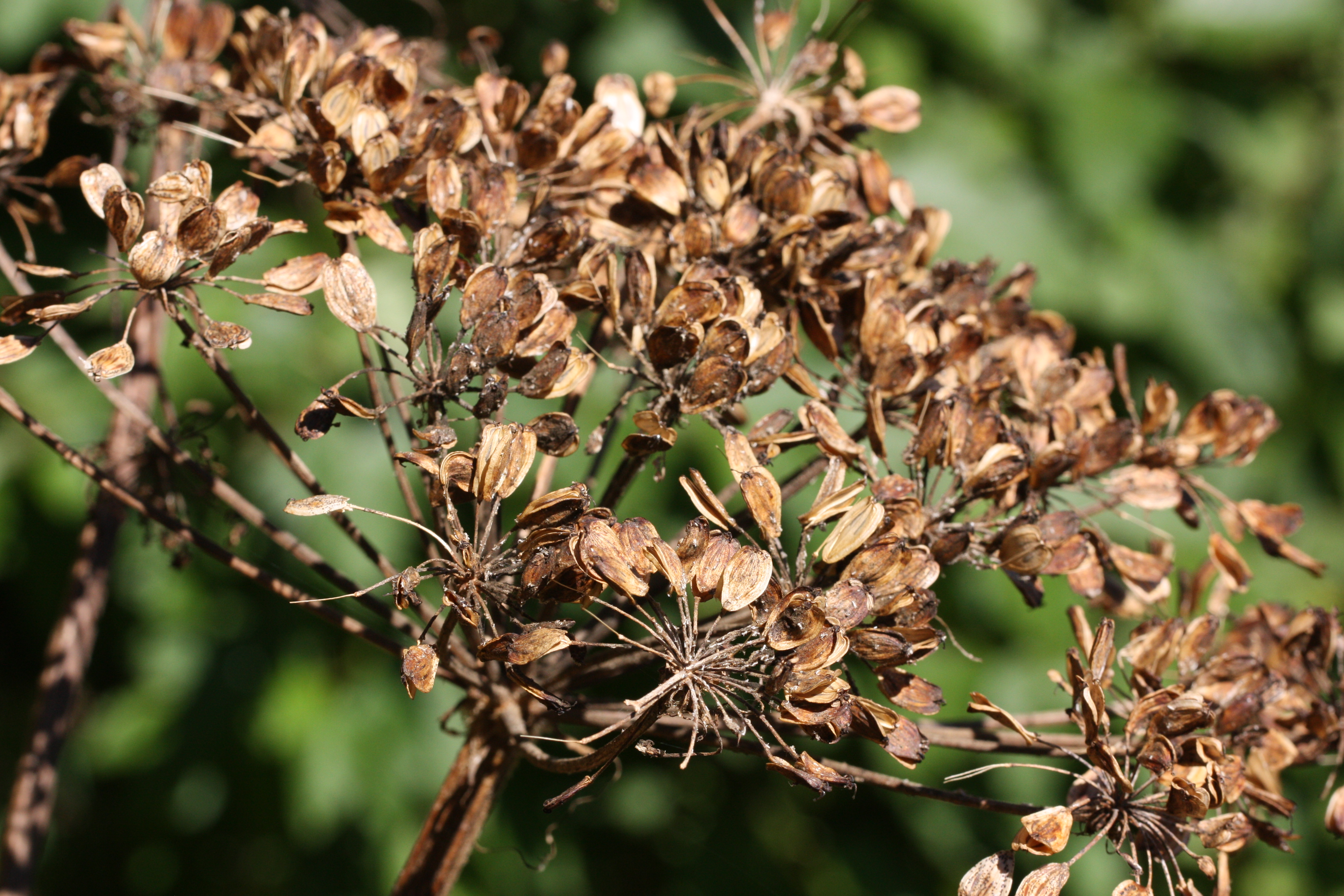
The seeds are 8–12 mm (5/16–1/2 in) long and 5–8 mm (3/16–5/16 in) wide.

Cow parsnip is a tall herbaceous perennial plant, reaching heights of 3 metres (10 feet). The stems are hollow and densely hairy. The leaves are very large, up to 40 centimetres (16 inches) across and divided into three lobes. Cow parsnip has the characteristic flower umbels of the carrot family (Apiaceae), blooming from February to September. The umbels can reach 30 cm (12 in) across, flat-topped or rounded, and composed of small white flowers. Sometimes the outer flowers of the umbel are much larger than the inner ones. The seeds are 8–12 millimetres (3/8–1/2 in) long and 5–8 mm (3/16–5/16 in) wide.

=== Similar species ===
Heracleum maximum is commonly confused with the non-native European species Heracleum mantegazzianum (giant hogweed), a much larger plant that typically has purplish spots on the stems, as well as more sharply serrated leaves.

Other tall invasive Heracleum species include H. sosnowskyi and H. persicum. Other similar species include wild carrot, cow parsley, poison hemlock, wild parsnip, and species of the genus Angelica.

== Taxonomy ==
The Plant List (which was last updated in 2013) classified H. maximum, H. lanatum, and H. sphondylium subsp. montanum as distinct species. According to both the Integrated Taxonomic Information System (ITIS) or the National Plant Germplasm System (NPGS), H. lanatum and H. maximum are synonyms for H. sphondylium subsp. montanum, a name proposed by Brummitt in 1971.

According to the Plant List and Plants of the World Online, H. lanatum and H. maximum are both accepted names, the latter with no infraspecific taxa. (Note: Heracleum maximum is also accepted by the Database of Vascular Plants of Canada (VASCAN), referencing the in prep family treatment in the Flora of North America project.) On the other hand, neither are recognized as accepted names by either the ITIS or NPGS. Besides H. lanatum and H. maximum, various scientific names have been attributed to this species.

Synonyms of the grouping previously classified H. lanatum include:

- Heracleum montanum
- Heracleum sphondylium subsp. lanatum
- Heracleum sphondylium var. lanatum
- Heracleum sphondylium subsp. montanum

Synonyms listed at Plants of the World Online include:

- Heracleum douglasii DC.
- Heracleum inperpastum Koidz.
- Heracleum lanatum Michx.
- Heracleum sphondylium var. lanatum (Michx.) Dorn
- Heracleum sphondylium subsp. lanatum (Michx.) Á.Löve & D.Löve
- Heracleum sphondylium var. tsurugisanense (Honda) H.Ohba
- Heracleum turugisanense Honda
- Pastinaca lanata Koso-Pol.
- Sphondylium lanatum (Michx.) Greene

As H. lanatum, it is listed as having the variety asiaticum.

The genus name Heracleum (from "Heracles") refers to the very large size of all parts of these plants.

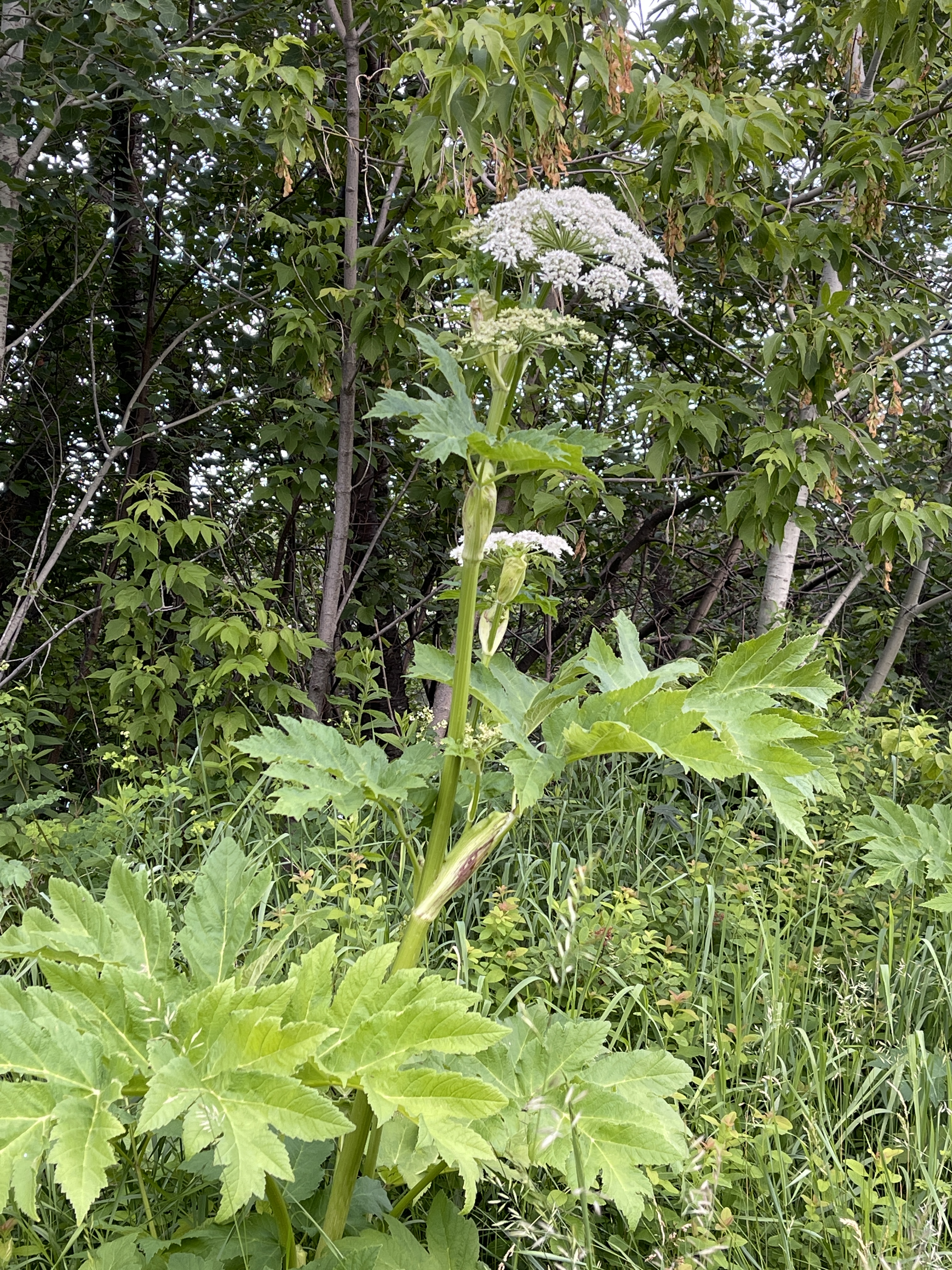
Heracleum maximum Bart. Batiscan River banks, Quebec

== Distribution and habitat ==
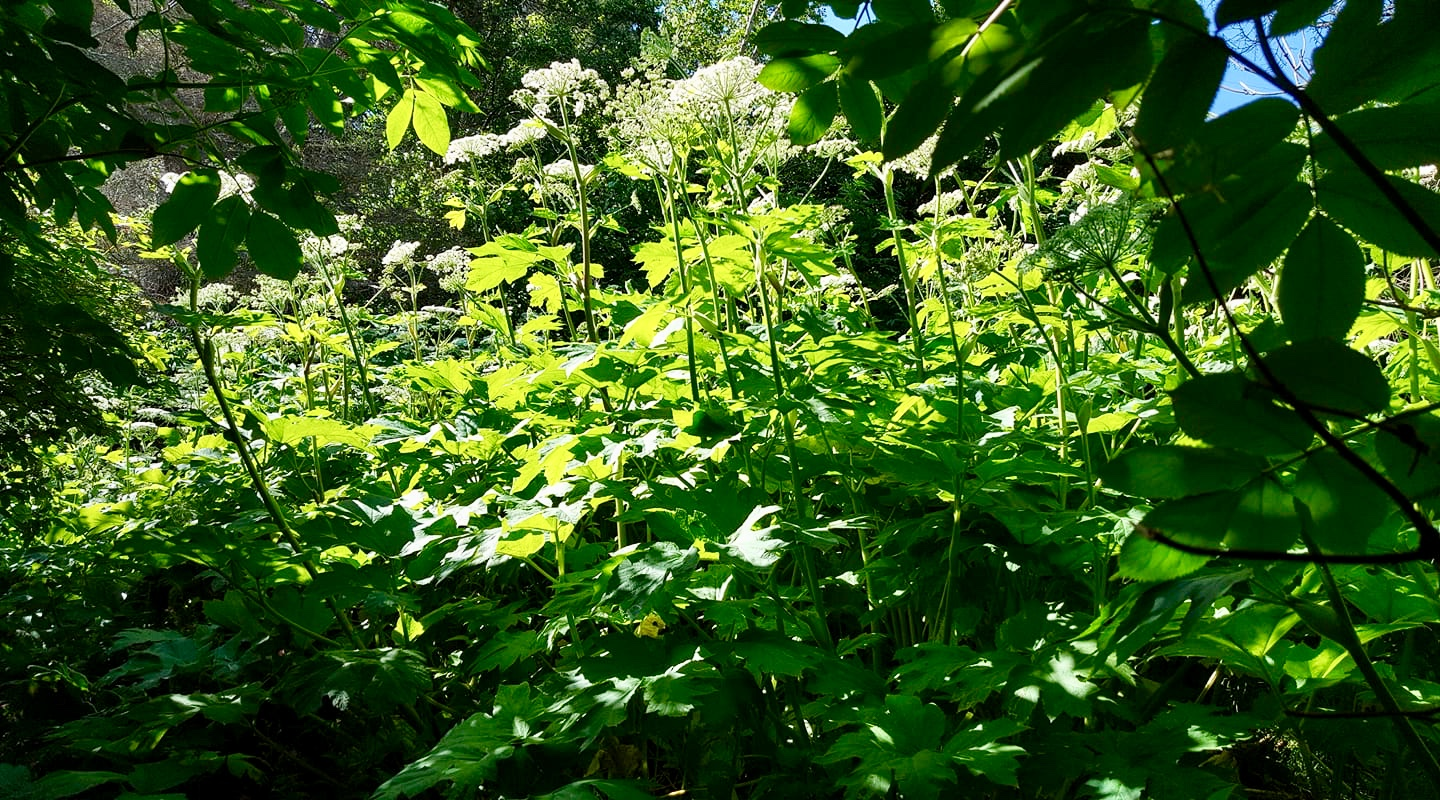
Specimen in Homer, Alaska

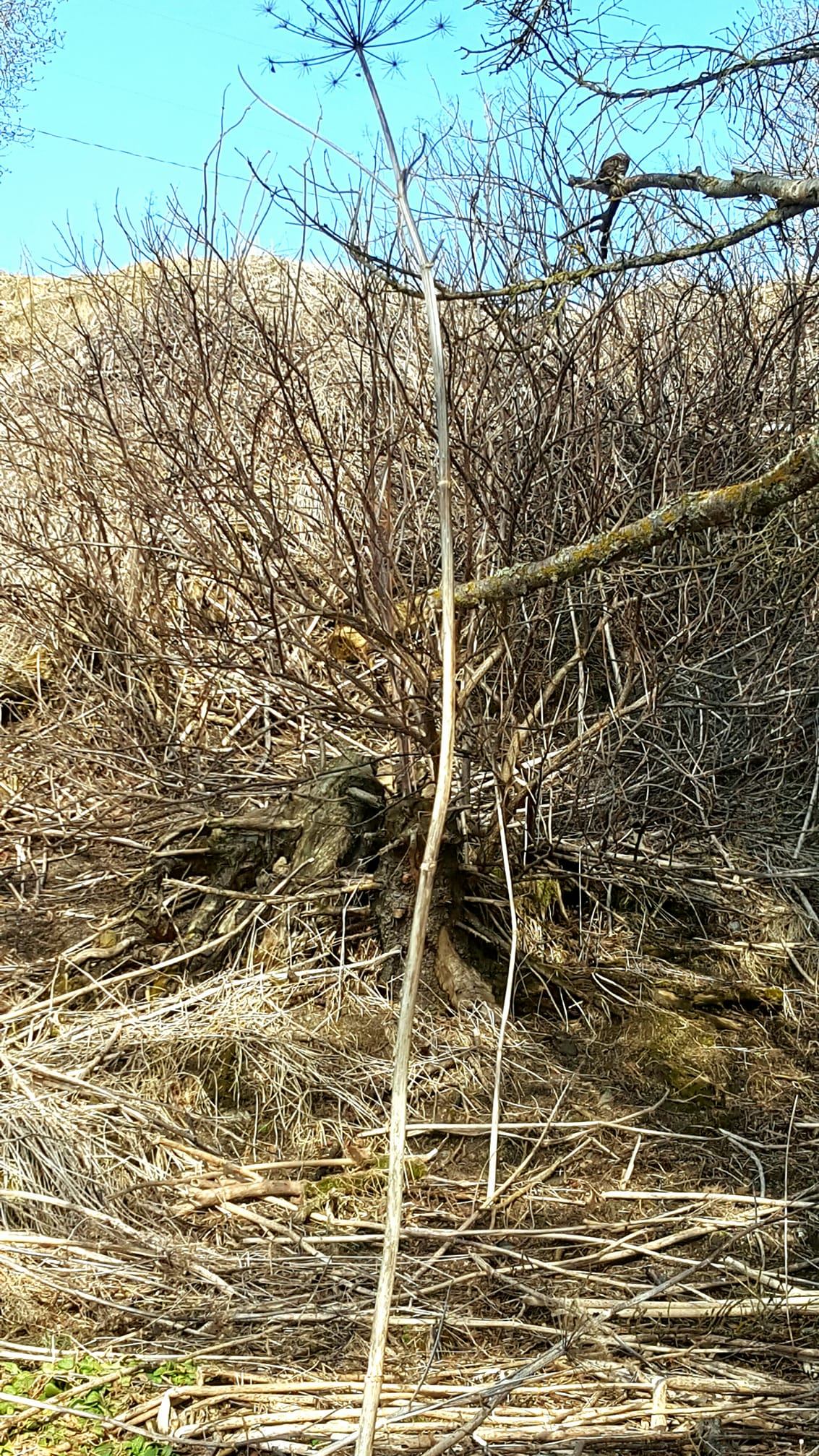
The same spot in late winter, showing the dead white stalks

The species is native to North America, being distributed throughout most of the continental United States (except the Gulf Coast and a few neighboring states), ranging from the Aleutian Islands and Alaska in the far northwest to Newfoundland on the east coast, extending south as far as California, New Mexico, Kansas, Ohio, and Georgia. It occurs from sea level to elevations of about 2,700 m (9,000 ft). It is especially prevalent in Alaska, where it is often found growing amongst plants like devil's club, which is nearly identical in size and somewhat similar in appearance, and monkshood, a very toxic flower. In Canada, it is found in every province and territory except Nunavut. It is listed as "Endangered" in Kentucky and "Special Concern" in Tennessee. The plant is also found in Siberia, East Asia, and the Kuril Islands.

== Ecology ==
The species is widely recognized as a valuable pasture plant for cows, sheep, and goats. It is also known to be important in the diets of numerous wild animals, especially bears, both grizzly bears and black bears. It is a host plant for the black swallowtail butterfly (Papilio polyxenes), short-tailed swallowtail butterfly (Papilio brevicauda), old world swallowtail butterfly (Papilio machaon), anise swallowtail butterfly (Papilio zelicaon), and the moths Eupithecia tripunctaria, Papaipema harrisii, Papaipema impecuniosa, Agonopterix clemensella, Agonopterix flavicomella, and Depressaria pastinacella.

== Toxicity ==
The plant contains furanocoumarins such as xanthotoxin, angelicin, pimpinellin and isopimpinellin, isoimperatorin, bergapten and isobergapten, 6‐isopentenyloxyisobergapten, and sphondin. In one study, the young leaves did not contain xanthotoxin, but older, senescing leaves contained "substantial amounts". Some of these furanocoumarins found in cow parsnip are known to have antimicrobial properties and are responsible for a rash producing erythematous vesicles (burn-like blisters) and hyperpigmentation that occurs after getting the clear sap onto one's skin. They are photosensitive, with the rash occurring only after exposure to ultraviolet light. Because of this, phytophotodermatitis causing skin blistering may occur after coming into contact with the sap on a sunny day. The scars and pigmentation from these blisters caused by some Heracleum species can last for months or years.

== Uses ==
The thick flower stems, coming into season in early summer, can be peeled and eaten cooked when young, as was done by Native Americans. Caution should be taken as the flowers resemble those of the extremely poisonous Cicuta maculata.

Indigenous North Americans have had a variety of uses for cow parsnip, often traveling long distances in the spring—80 kilometres (50 miles) or more—to find the succulent plant shoots. The young stems and leafstalks were peeled and usually eaten raw, while early American settlers cooked the plant. In terms of taste, texture, and nutrients, the peeled stalks resembled celery, which gave rise to the common name "Indian celery". The natives were aware of the toxic effects of the plant, knowing that if the outer skin were not removed, one would get an "itchy mouth" or blistering skin. Pregnant women were warned away from the flower bud stalks to prevent newborns from asphyxiating when crying.

At least seven native groups in North America used the plant as a dermatological aid. It could be an ingredient in poultices applied to bruises or sores. A poultice prepared from the roots of cow parsnip was applied to swellings, especially of the feet. The dried stems were used as drinking straws for the old or infirm, or made into flutes for children. An infusion of the flowers can be rubbed on the body to repel flies and mosquitoes. A yellow dye can be made from the roots.

The Haida use the timing of cow parsnip blooming as an indicator that gull eggs are no longer safe to eat.
