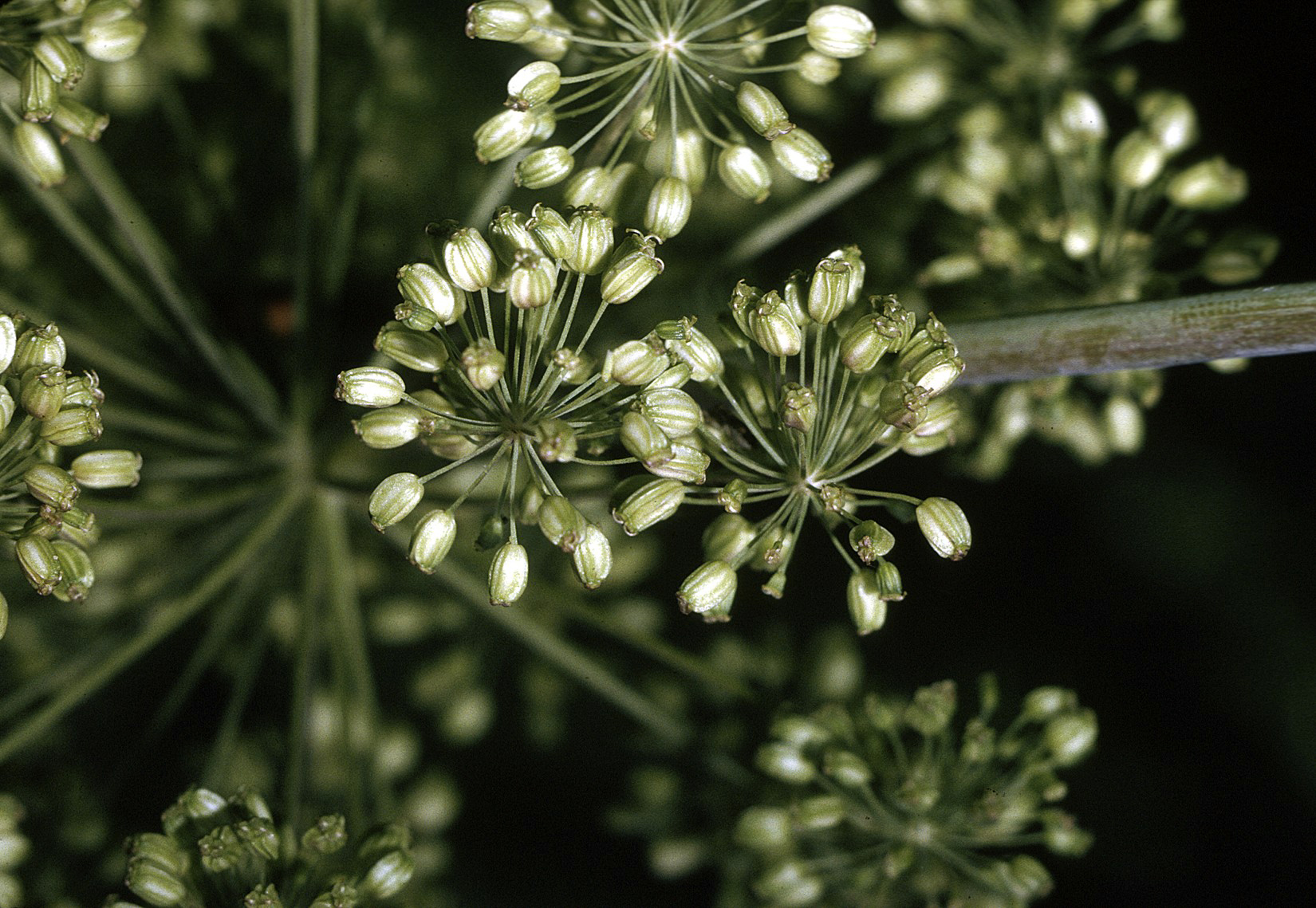

Conservation status
- Least Concern (IUCN 3.1)

Scientific classification
- Kingdom: Plantae
- Clade: Tracheophytes
- Clade: Angiosperms
- Clade: Eudicots
- Clade: Asterids
- Order: Apiales
- Family: Apiaceae
- Genus: Angelica
- Species: A. atropurpurea

Binomial name
- Angelica atropurpurea L.

Synonyms
- Angelica atropurpurea var. atropurpurea; Angelica atropurpurea var. occidentalis Fassett; Archangelica atropurpurea (L.) Hoffm.; Selinum atropurpureum Link

= Angelica atropurpurea =

Species of flowering plant

Angelica atropurpurea, known commonly as purplestem angelica, great angelica, American angelica, high angelica, and masterwort, is a species of flowering plant that can be found in moist and swampy woodlands, mostly by riverbanks, in eastern North America.

== Description ==
Angelica atropurpurea is a perennial plant that grows to 6 ft (180 cm) tall. The erect, branching stem is purple, smooth, hollow, and sturdy. The compound leaves are bipinnate, with 3 to 5 leaflets per leaf. The total width of a lower leaf may be up to 2 ft (61 cm), and the leaflets are 0.75–4.5 in (1.9–11.4 cm) long and 0.5–2.5 in (1.3–6.4 cm) across. They are generally ovate with serrated margins, and some are cleft into either shallow or deep lobes.

The plant has white to greenish flowers in umbrella-like umbels. One umbel may have as many as 40 branches and be up to 8 in (20 cm) across. Each flower has 5 petals and measures up to 0.25 in (0.64 cm).

== Distribution and habitat ==
It has been found in eastern Canada (Nunavut, Ontario, Quebec, Labrador, Newfoundland, all 3 Maritime Provinces) and the United States (from New England south as far as North Carolina, and west to Minnesota, Iowa, and Tennessee). The plant grows in swamps, wet thickets, edges of woodlands next to wetlands, marshes, fens, and seeps. It is typically found in calcareous habitats with a consistent moisture.

== Ecology ==
Flowers bloom late spring to early summer. A. atropurpurea is a host plant for the black swallowtail butterfly (Papilio polyxenes), the short-tailed swallowtail (Papilio brevicauda), and the moths Agonopterix clemensella, Papaipema harrisii, and Idia americalis. The nectar of the flowers attracts small bees.

== Uses ==
The stalks can be eaten like celery and the flavor is similar. Early American settlers boiled parts of the plant to make into candy and added it to cakes. In Europe, it was believed that the plant could cure alcoholism.

The aromatic root of angelica has widespread use as a purification herb among the Native American cultures. In California, it is often burned during a shaman's prayers in a healing ceremony. It has traditionally been held in high esteem by native peoples in Arkansas, who have often carried it in their medicine bags and mixed it with tobacco for smoking. In the Mvskoke Creek tribes of Alabama, Oklahoma, and Northwest Florida, Angelica atropurpurea (known as notossv in the Creek language) has both medicinal and ceremonial uses. Medicinally, notossv is used by the Creeks to: cure back pain in adults; to calm panic attacks or people that are in hysterics; as a vermifuge in children; as well as treating stomach disorders. Mvskoke Creek Ceremonial uses include preventing heat stroke during the Ribbon Dance in the Green Corn Ceremony, aiding ceremonial singers, and to help those in legal trouble.

== Gallery ==
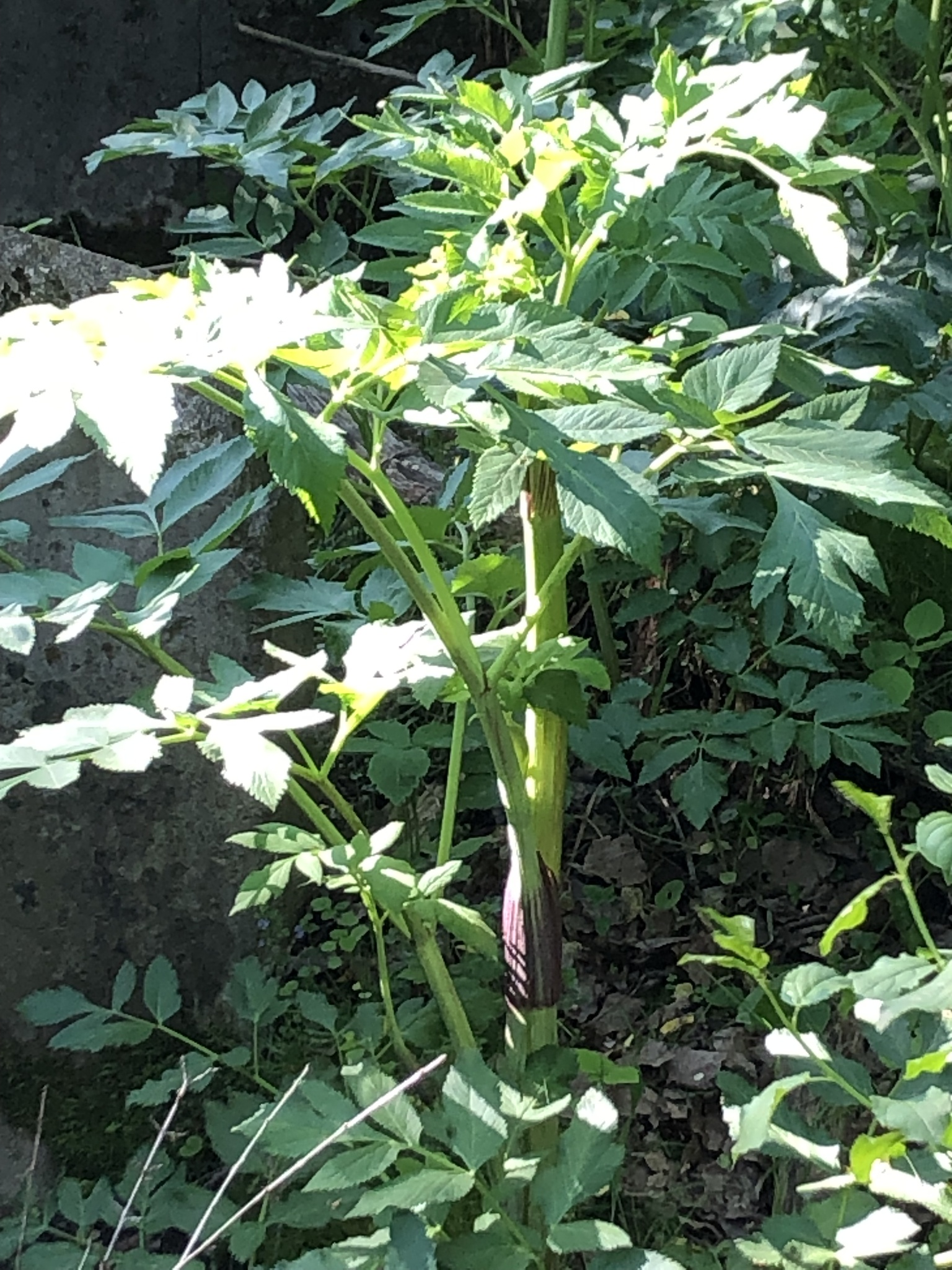
Purple-stemmed Angelica (Angelica atropurpurea) found near Winona, MN, USA. The plant is seen here where it was growing near a creek on 27 May 2023

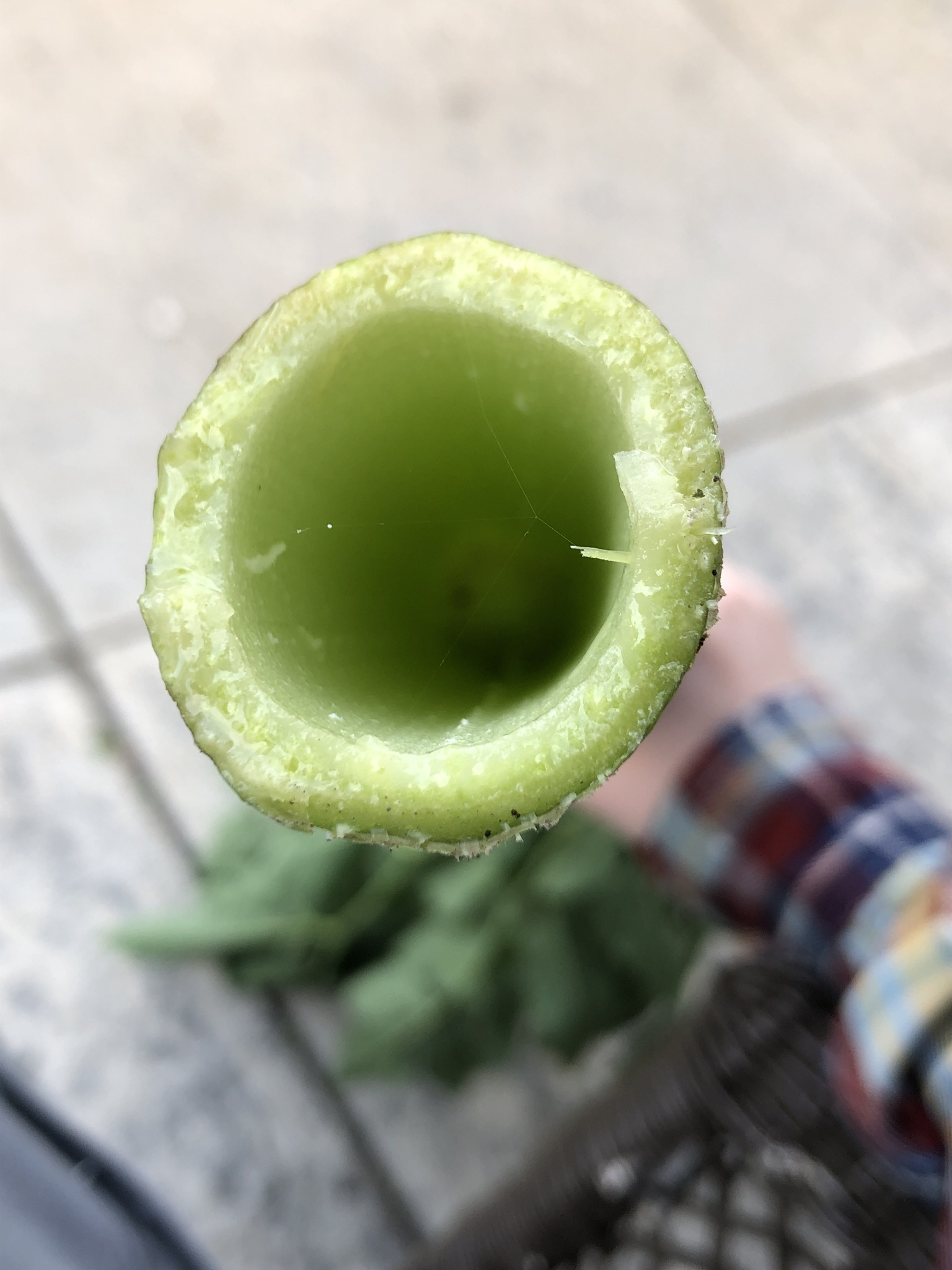
Cross section cut through the stem of Angelica atropurpurea showing how it is hollow inside.

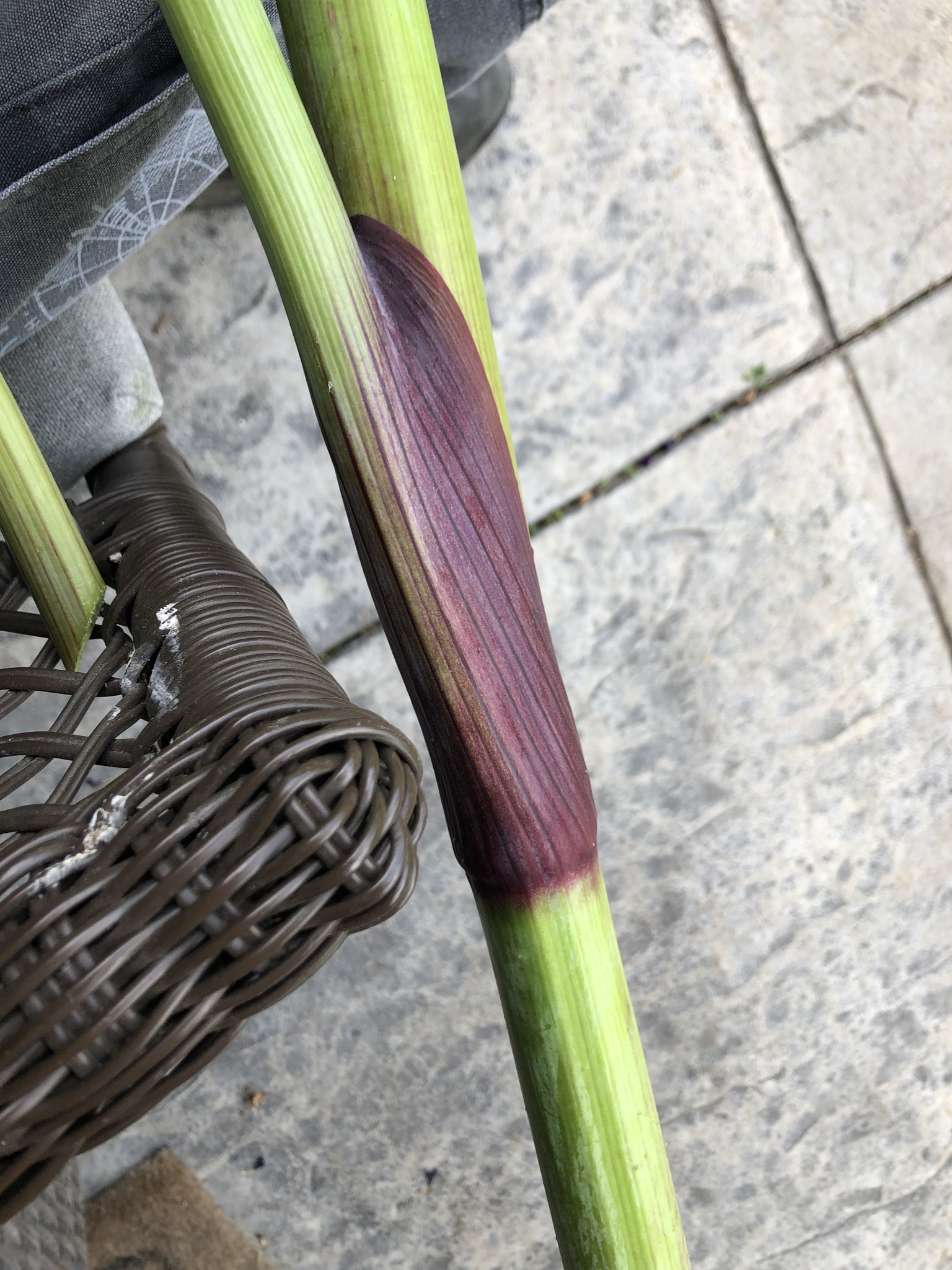
The green stem has a vibrant wine-purple sheath around the stem where it branches. 27 May 2023

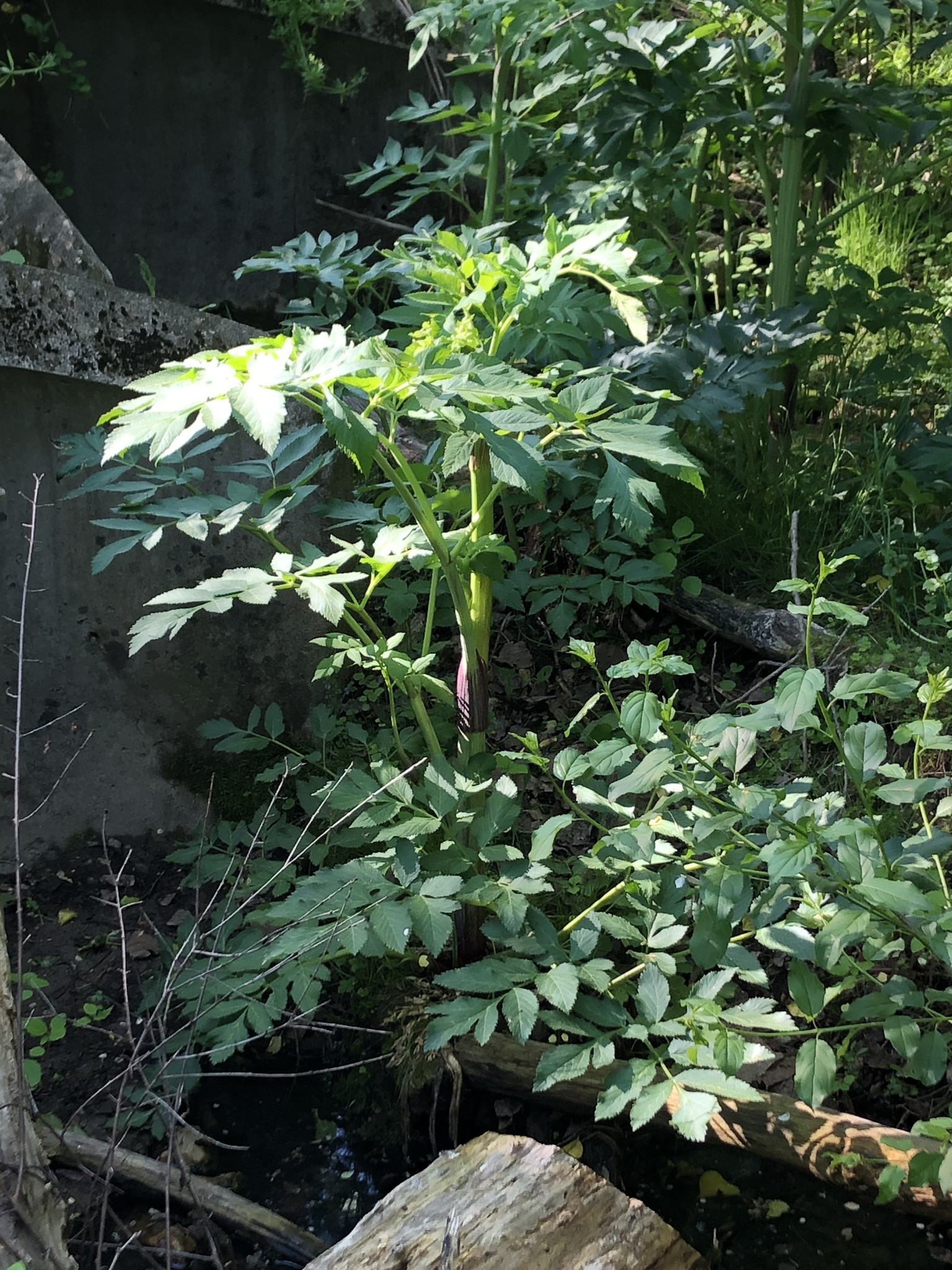
Purple-stemmed Angelica (Angelica atropurpurea). This individual is ~4 ft tall. 27 May 2023

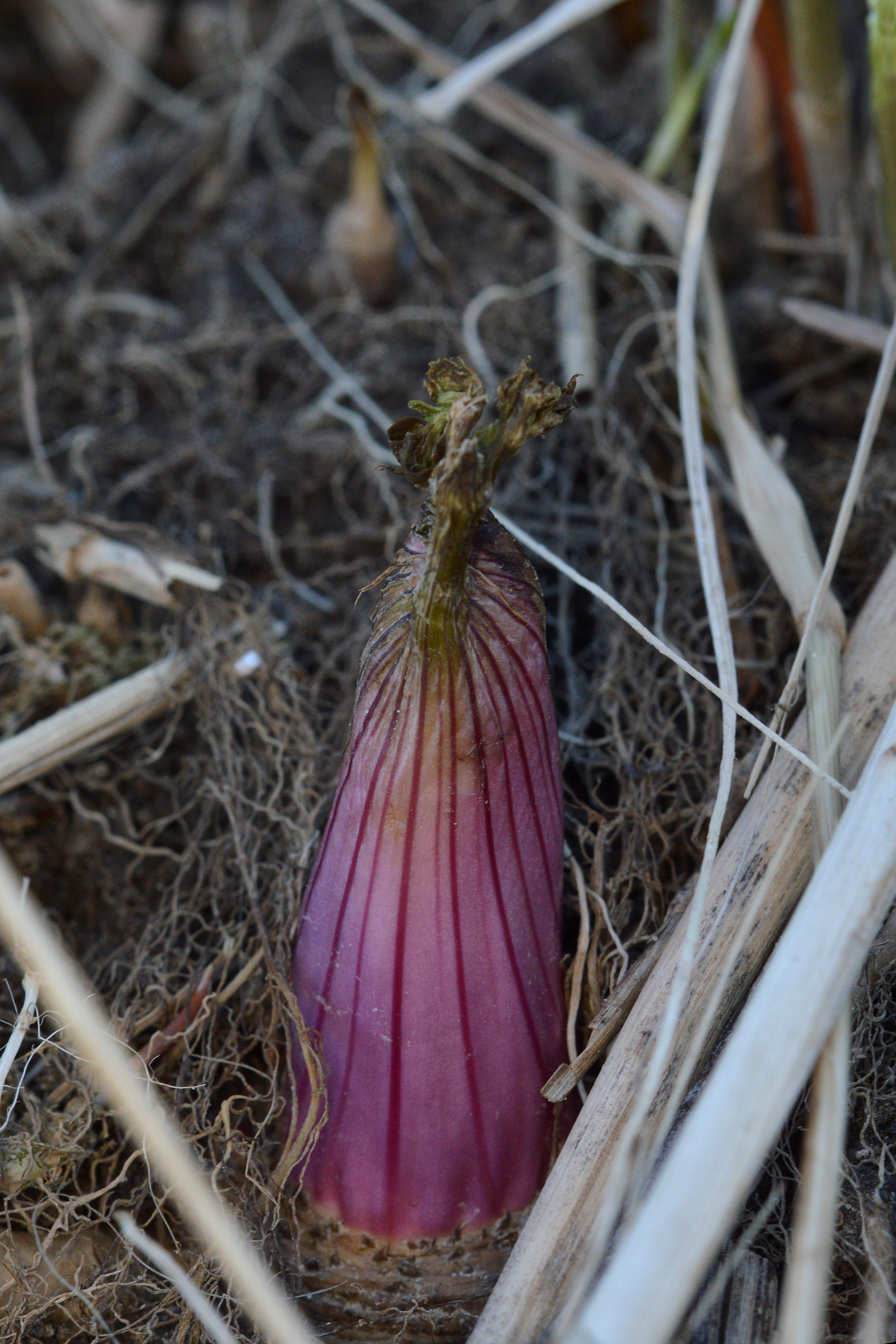
Purple-stemmed Angelica (Angelica atropurpurea) in Kitchener, Ontario, Canada 4 March 2018 showing the plant in its early stages of growth back from the base of a previous year's stem

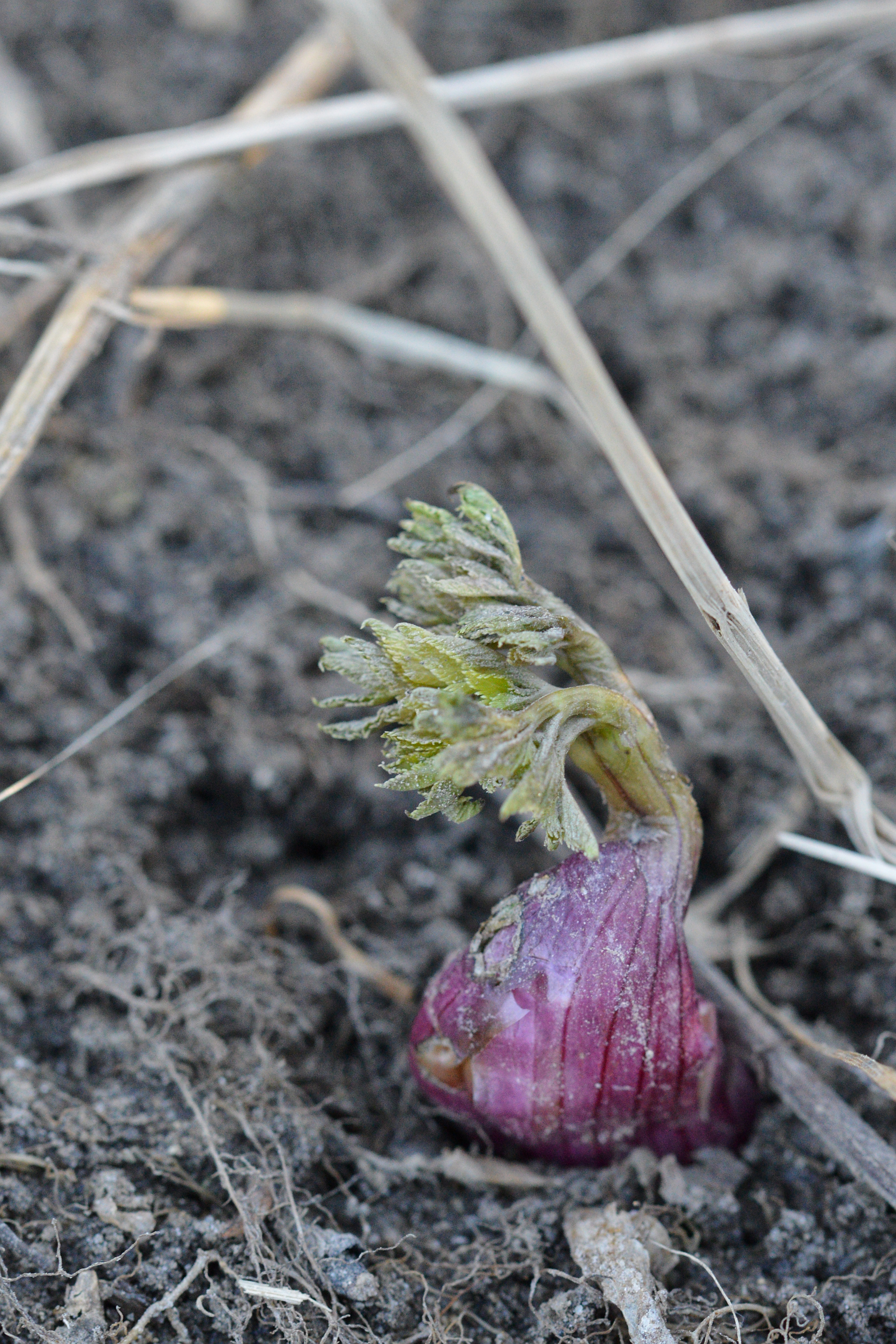
Purple-stemmed Angelica (Angelica atropurpurea) in Kitchener, Ontario, Canada 4 March 2018 showing its first leaves

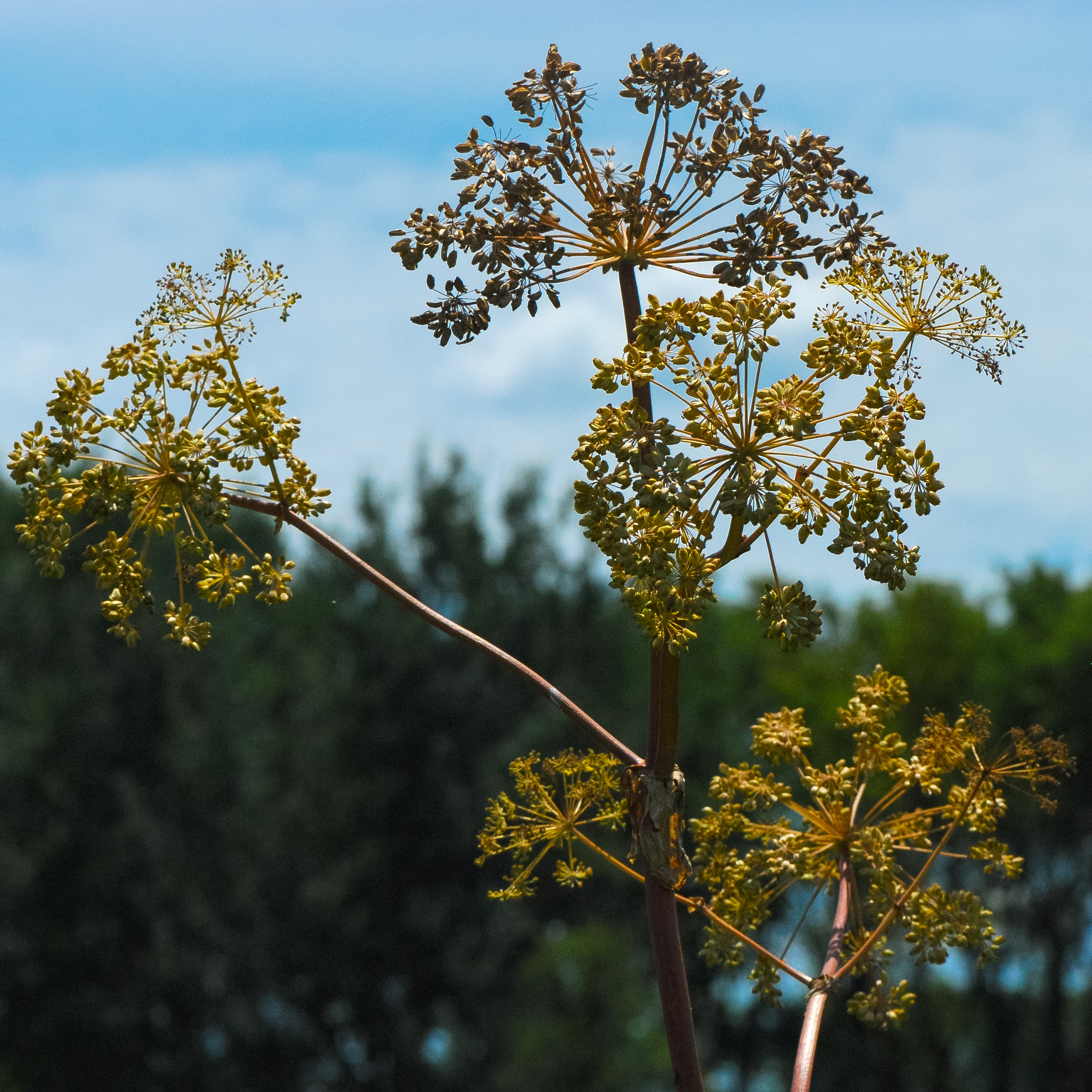
Angelica atropurpurea, Purple-stemmed angelica - Berlin Fen - Wisconsin State Natural Area #207 Green Lake County 8 July 2012

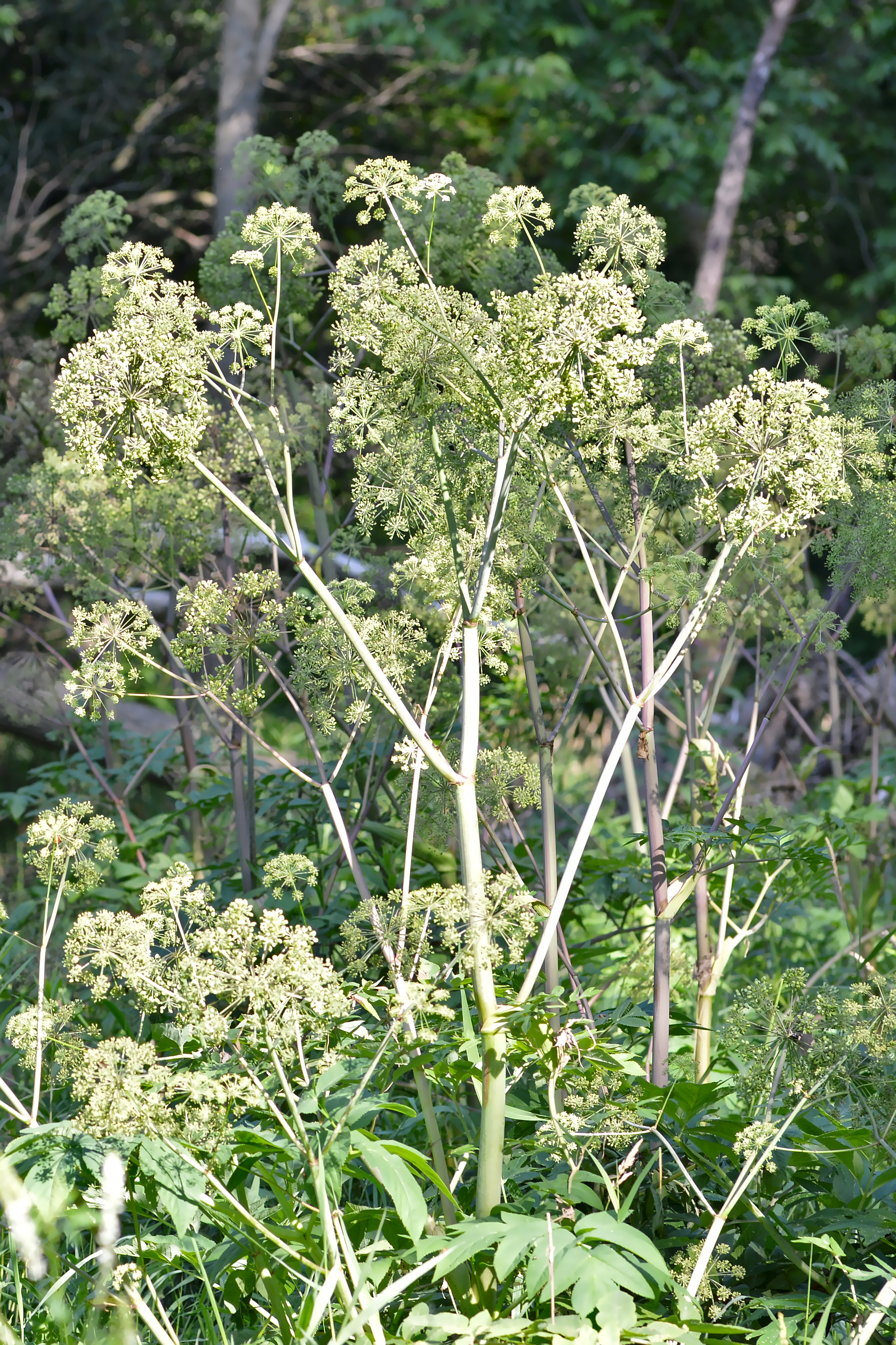
Purple-stemmed Angelica (Angelica atropurpurea) in London, Ontario, Canada 9 July 2015

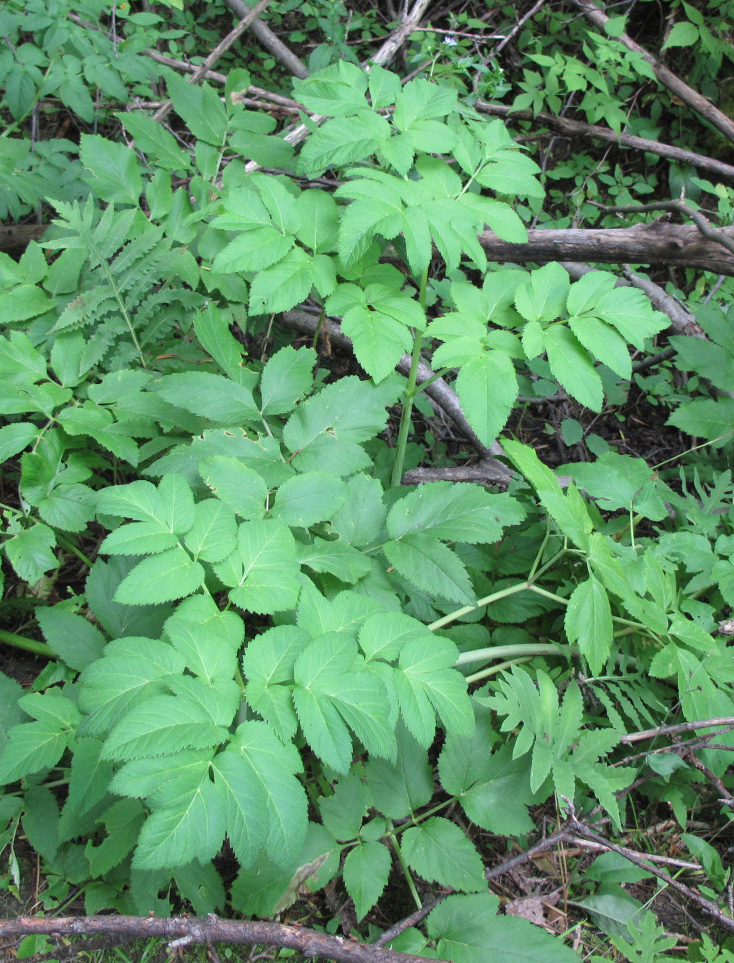
Foliage of Angelica atropurpurea documented for the Bibliothèque de l'Université Laval in Quebec, Canada

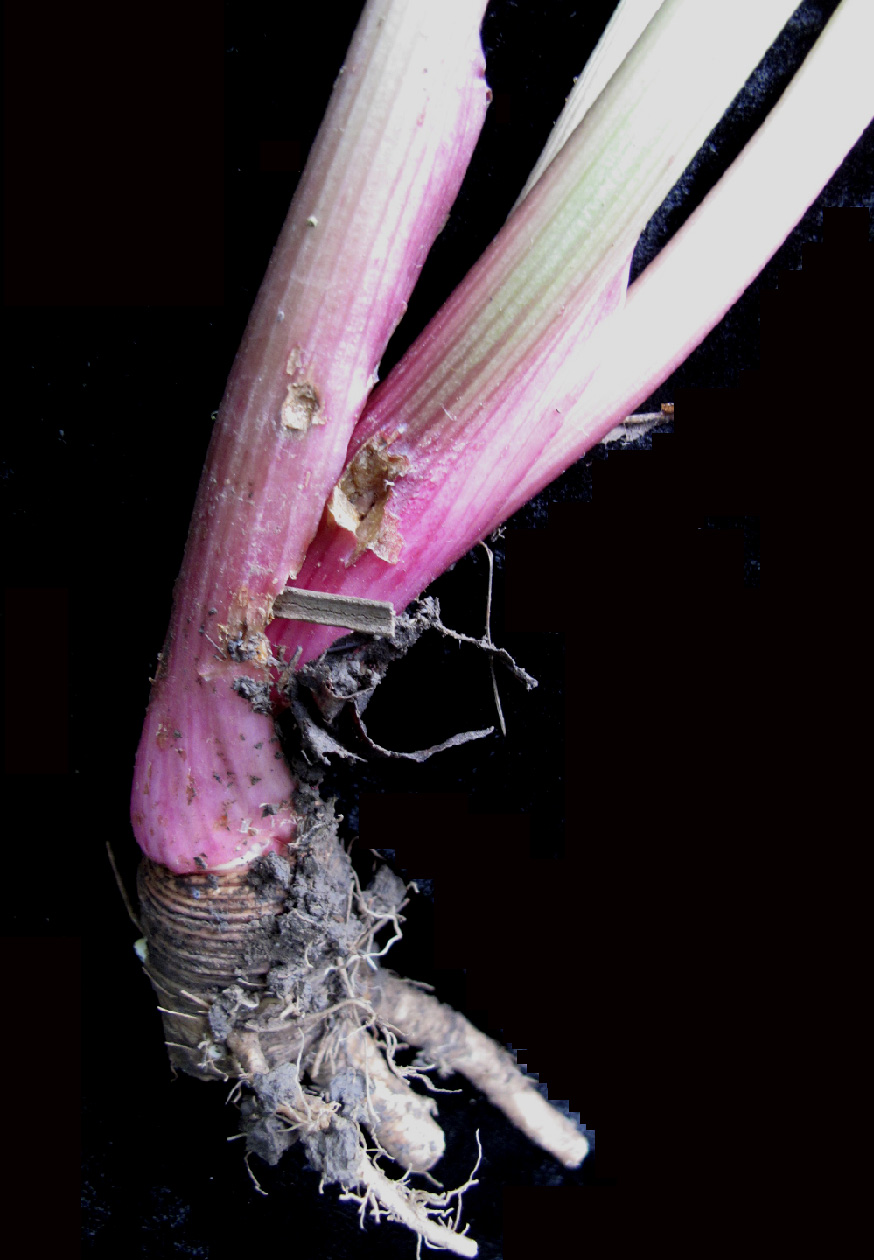
Root area of Angelica atropurpurea documented for the Bibliothèque de l'Université Laval in Quebec, Canada

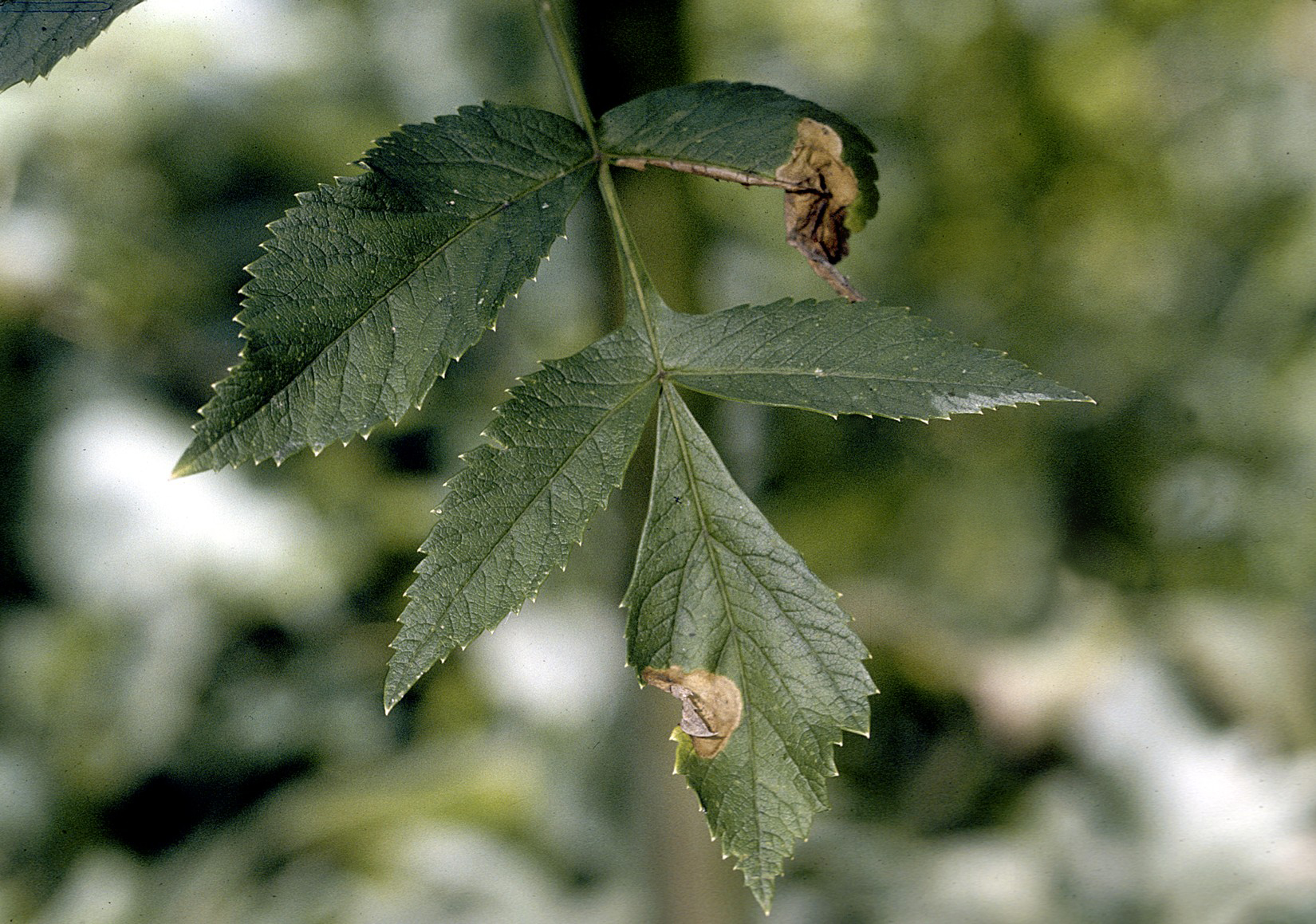
Angelica atropurpurea L. (purplestem angelica) leaf with minor damage, photographed in 1995, Source: USDA Natural Resources Conservation Service PLANTS Database

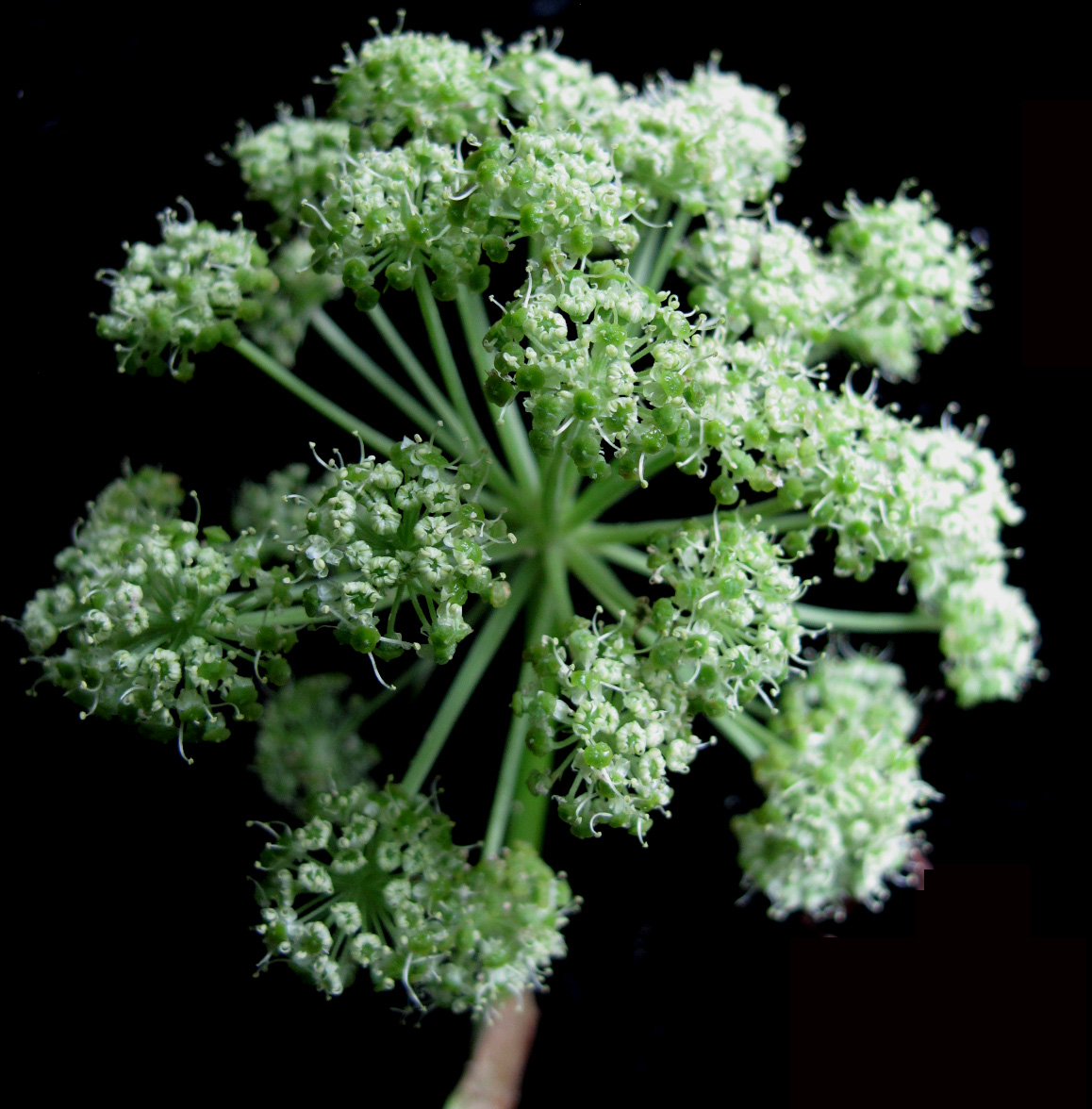
Flower head in bud of Angelica atropurpurea documented for the Bibliothèque de l'Université Laval in Quebec, Canada

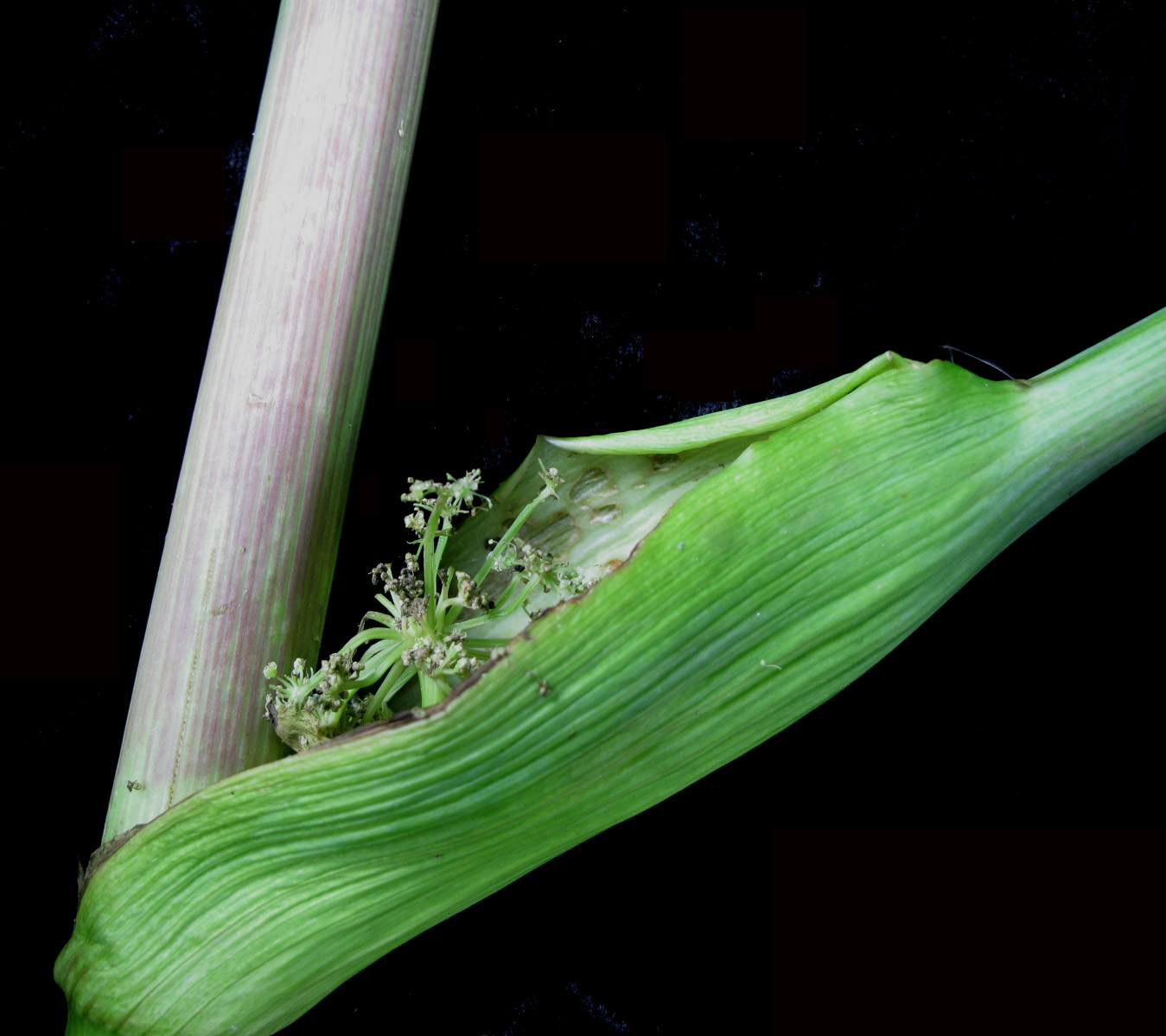
Sheath around the stem with a flower head in seed documented for the Bibliothèque de l'Université Laval in Quebec, Canada

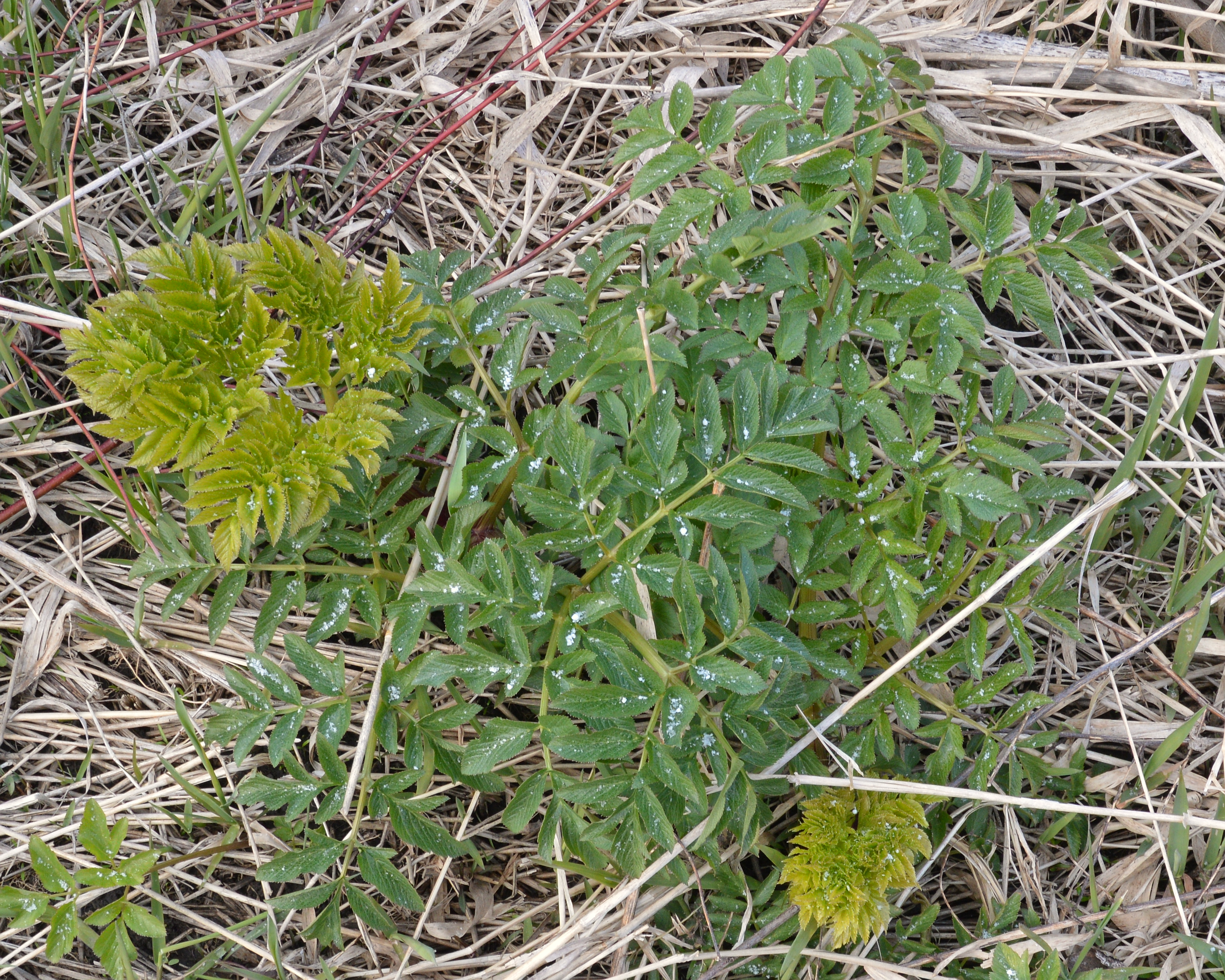
Young Angelica atropurpurea plant in Guelph, Ontario, Canada 21 April 2020

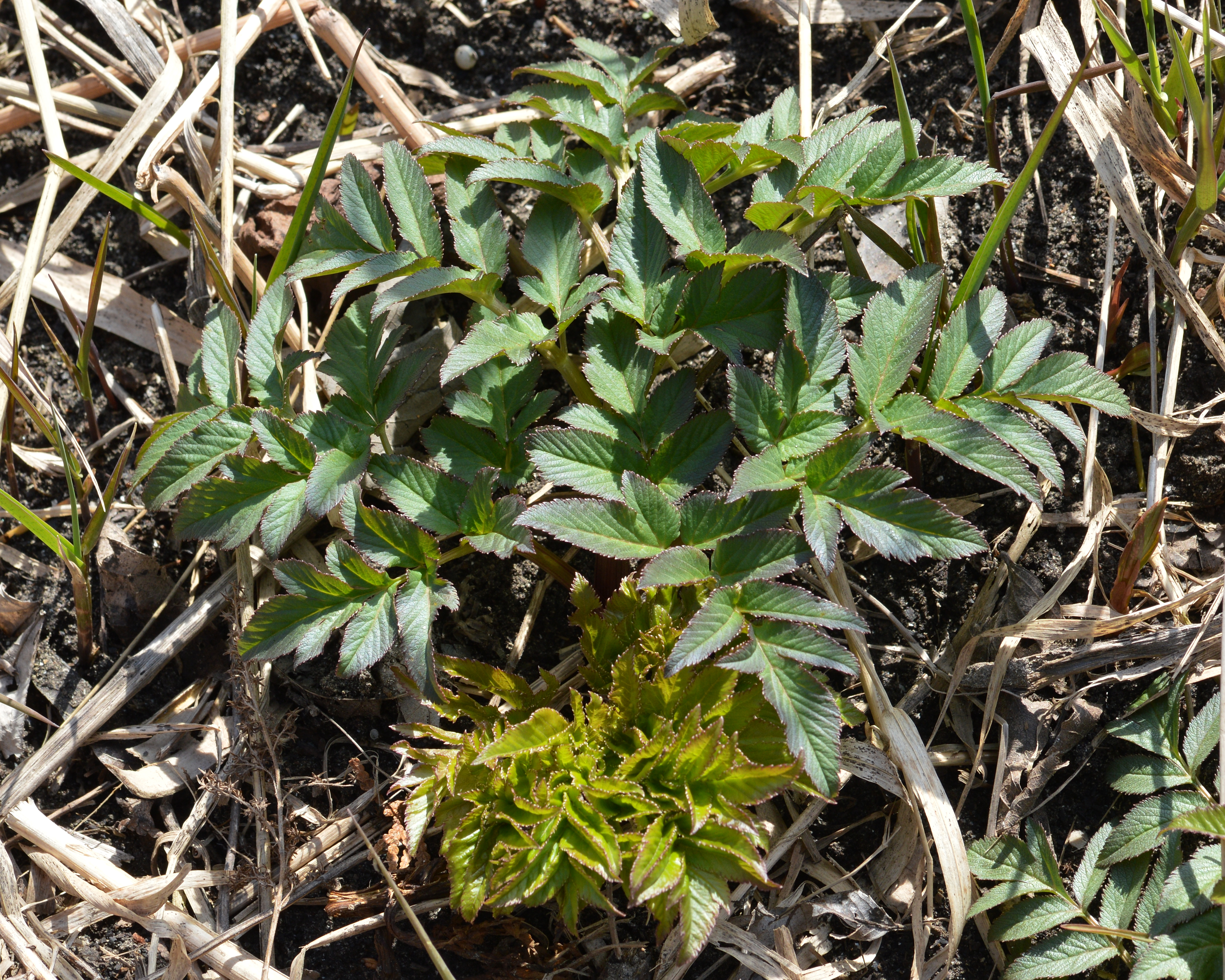
Young Angelica atropurpurea plant in Guelph, Ontario, Canada 8 April 2020
