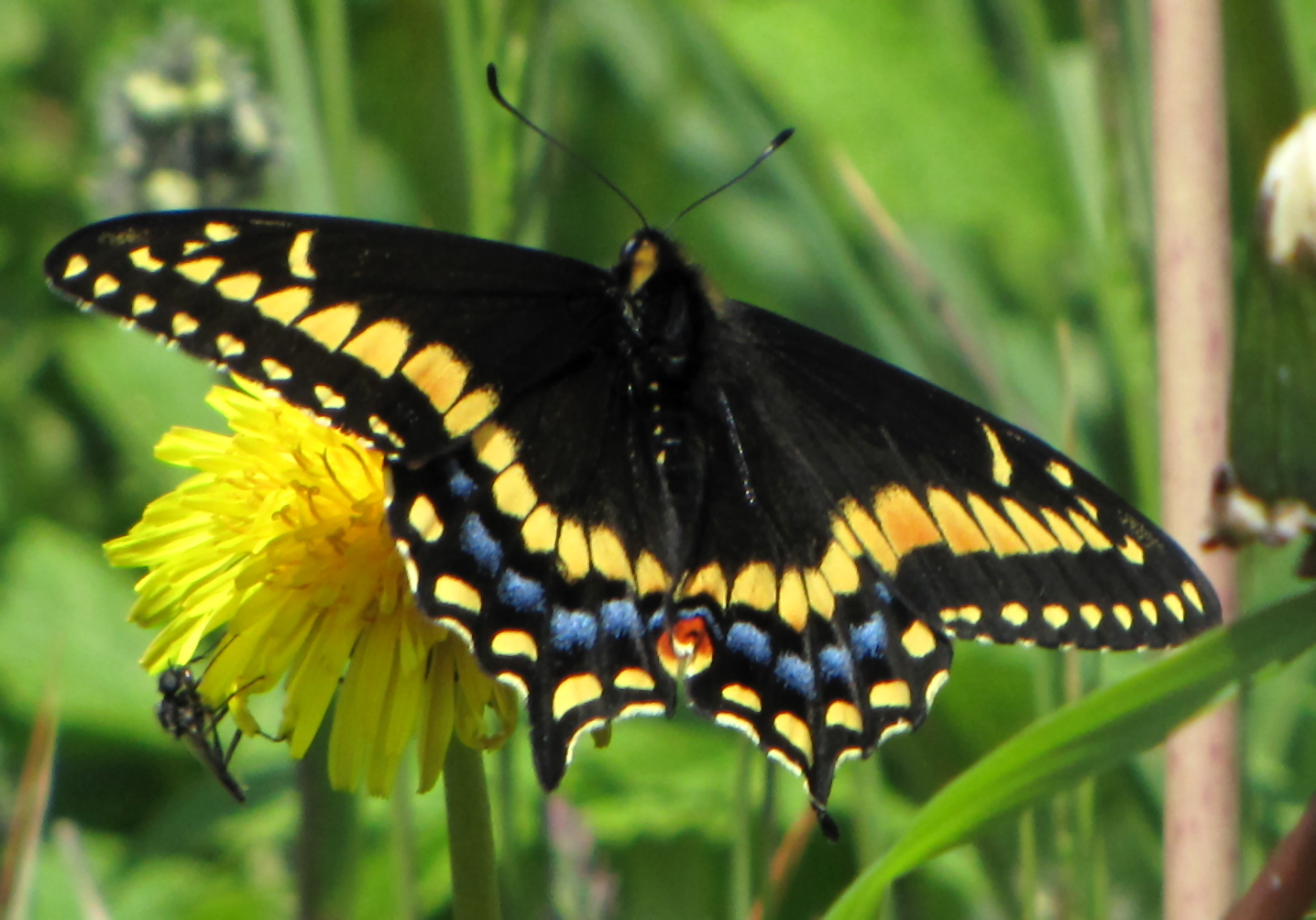
- Elliston, Newfoundland and Labrador
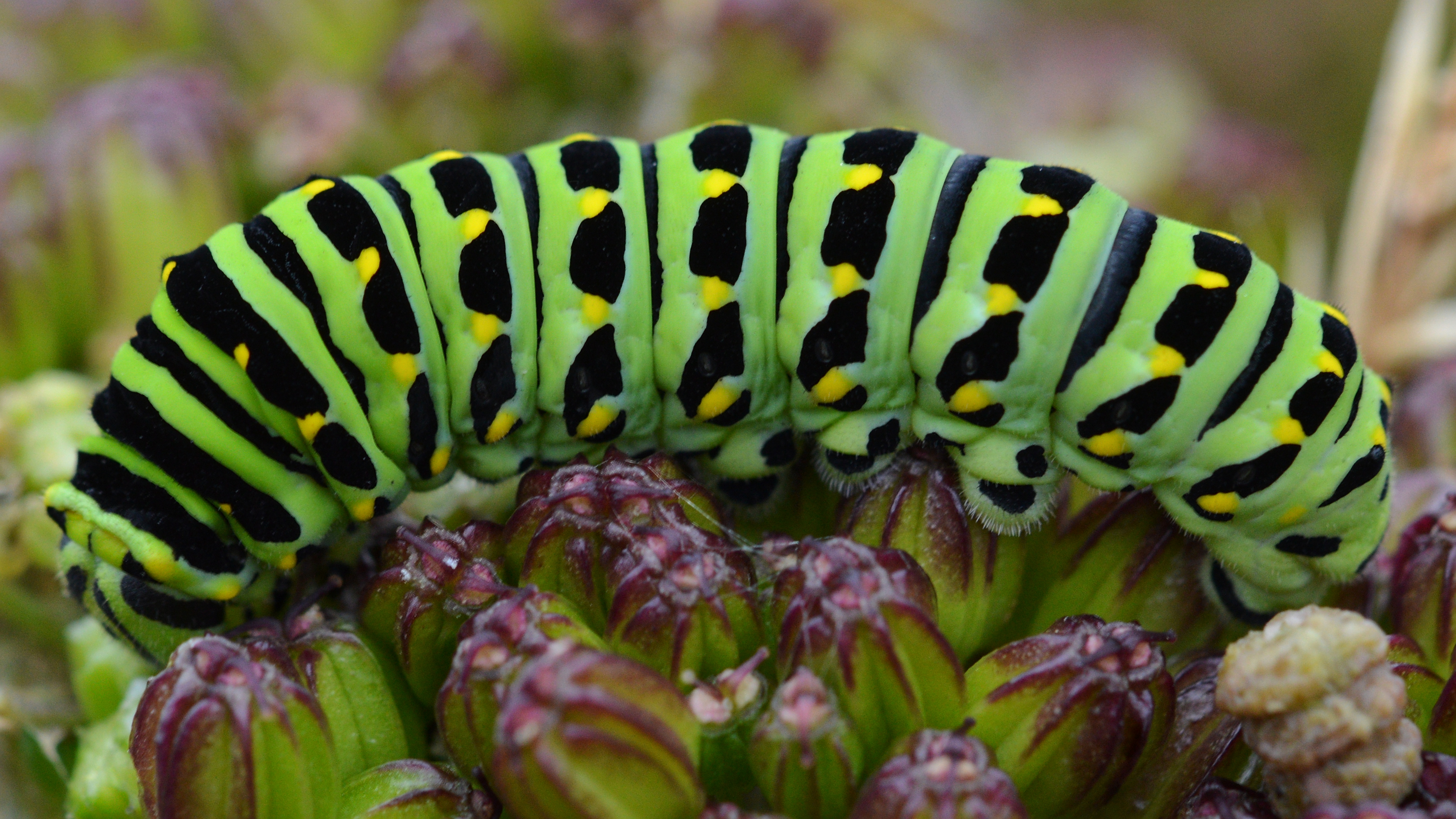

Conservation status
- Apparently Secure (NatureServe)

Scientific classification
- Kingdom: Animalia
- Phylum: Arthropoda
- Clade: Pancrustacea
- Class: Insecta
- Order: Lepidoptera
- Family: Papilionidae
- Genus: Papilio
- Species: P. brevicauda

Binomial name
- Papilio brevicauda Saunders, 1869
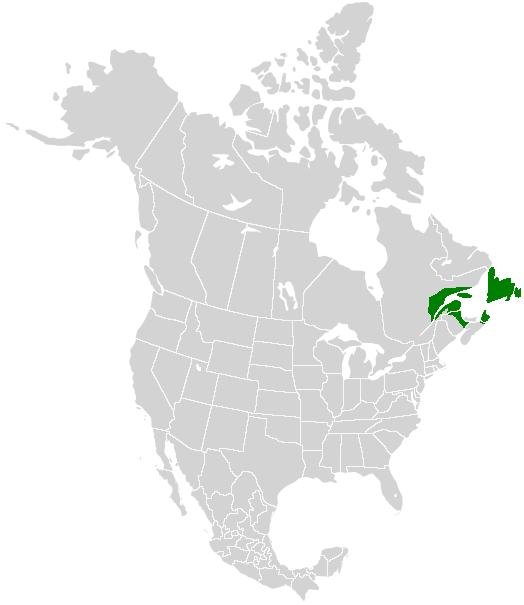

= Papilio brevicauda =

Species of butterfly

Papilio brevicauda, the short-tailed swallowtail, is a North American butterfly in the family Papilionidae.

== Description ==
The short-tailed swallowtail is very similar to the male black swallowtail (Papilio polyxenes) but has shorter tails, and the forewing tip is rounder. The yellow bands of spots on the upperside of the wings are often more orange (except in the western part of its range).

== Habitat ==
This butterfly primarily breeds on Scotch lovage (Ligusticum scoticum) and is often found very near the ocean where its larval stage food sources grow. It is especially fond of headlands with Scotch lovage and members of the parsley family (Apiaceae), including cow parsnip (Heracleum species), angelica (Angelica atropurpurea). It is a very strong flier so windy locations are not an issue.

== Flight ==
The short-tailed swallowtail is on the wing from mid-June to July.

== Life cycle ==
Males will seek females by awaiting them on hilltops. Females lay their eggs singly on host plant leaves. The eggs are cream and later obtain a reddish-brown ring. The pale green to creamish-green larva has black bands between segments with yellow spots on the black bands (these spots are orange in Cape Breton Island). The chrysalis is either green or black brown. The chrysalis hibernates. The short-tailed swallowtail has one brood per year, sometimes having a second partial brood.

== Host plants ==
Here is a list of host plants used by the short-tailed swallowtail:

- Angelica atropurpurea
- Seacoast angelica, Angelica lucida
- Celery, Apium graveolens
- Chinese hemlock-parsley, Conioselinum chinense
- Queen Anne's lace, Daucus carota subspecies sativus
- Cow parsnip, Heracleum lanatum
- Scotch lovage, Ligusticum scoticum
- Parsnip, Pastinaca sativa
- Parsley, Petroselinum crispum
