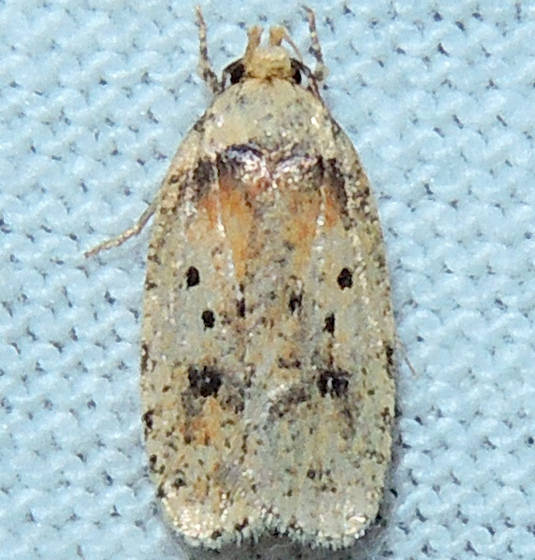

Scientific classification
- Kingdom: Animalia
- Phylum: Arthropoda
- Clade: Pancrustacea
- Class: Insecta
- Order: Lepidoptera
- Family: Depressariidae
- Genus: Agonopterix
- Species: A. flavicomella

Binomial name
- Agonopterix flavicomella (Engel, 1907)

Synonyms
- Depressaria flavicomella Engel, 1907

= Agonopterix flavicomella =

Species of moth

Agonopterix flavicomella is a moth of the family Depressariidae. It is found in North America, where it has been recorded from Alabama, Georgia, Illinois, Indiana, Kentucky, Maine, Michigan, Minnesota, North Carolina, Ohio, Tennessee, Virginia and West Virginia.

The wingspan is about 16 mm. Adults are on wing from April to August and in October.

The larvae feed on Heracleum lanatum and Taenidia integerrima.
