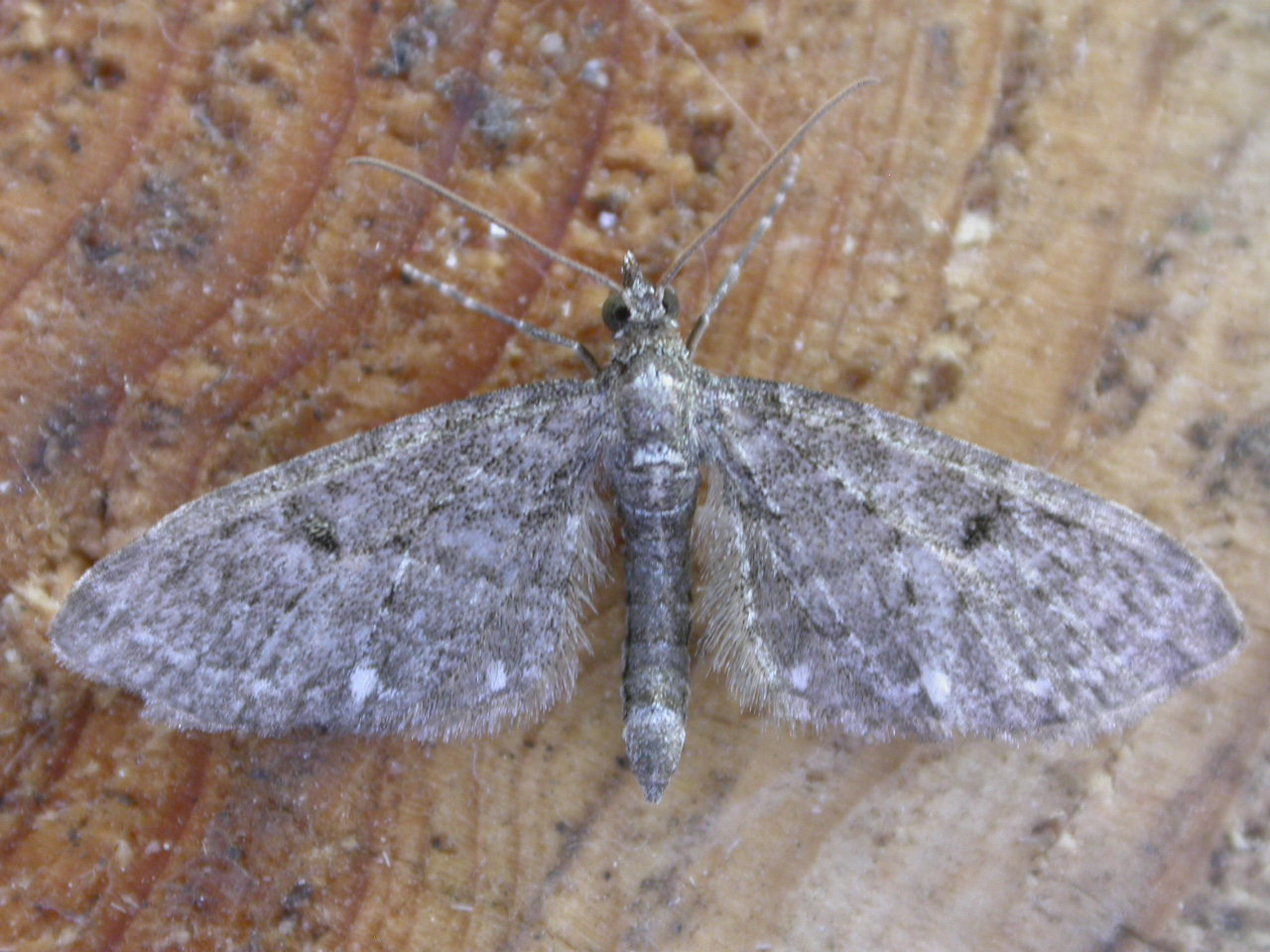

Scientific classification
- Kingdom: Animalia
- Phylum: Arthropoda
- Class: Insecta
- Order: Lepidoptera
- Family: Geometridae
- Genus: Eupithecia
- Species: E. tripunctaria

Binomial name
- Eupithecia tripunctaria Herrich-Schäffer, 1852

Synonyms
- Phalaena albipunctata Haworth, 1809; Eupithecia albipunctata

= Eupithecia tripunctaria =

Species of moth

Eupithecia tripunctaria, the white-spotted pug, is a moth of the family Geometridae. The species can be found from Europe to Korea and Japan and in North America.

== Distribution ==
Presence extends through the Palearctic realm - (Europe, (central Scandinavia to the Alps), Russia, Russian Far East, Siberia, Amur, and Baikal to Japan and the Kuril Islands. In the Pyrenees and the Alps, E. tripunctaria occurs up to a height of 1800 m. asl. Another distribution area is located in North America, from Newfoundland to British Columbia and the San Bernardino Mountains in Southern California. The species prefers lowland forests, forest edges and damp meadows.

== Morphology ==
The wingspan is 17–21 mm. The ground colour of the wings varies from ash grey to dark ashy brown to blackish, with the hind wings often averaging slightly paler. A pale waved line follows the margin of both wings with certain parts broken off into specific white marks which are more pronounced. These white marks give the species its name, and while they can show on both wings they are commonly absent from the hindwings. Though it is a good feature to identify this species, care should still be taken to separate it from other related species. Similar to other pug moths, a black discal spot is present on the center of the forewings, though it is often hard to see. The melanistic form f. angelicata which is a uniform smoky black, entirely without markings except for the deeper black cell-spot which occasionally appears in some populations. Such wholly dark forms are hard to separate from other species. The egg has an oval shape and shows hexagonal depressions in the shell sculpture.

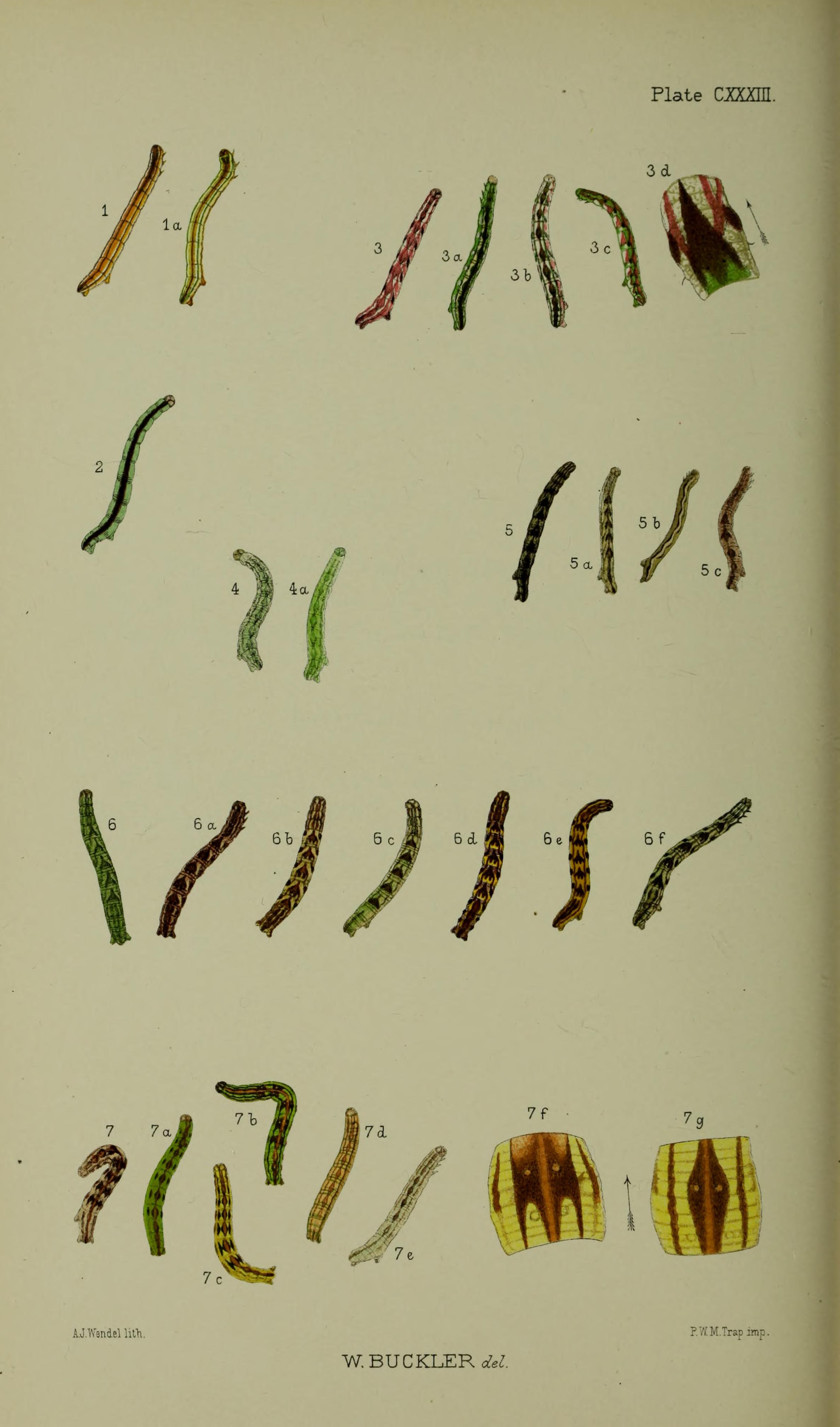
Figs 6,6a,6b,6c,6d,6e 6f larvae after final moult

Adult caterpillars are either greenish or brownish coloured and show very clear dark, heart-shaped, brightly framed back spots, whose tips are directed forward. The brownish pupa has dark green wing sheaths and is provided with two strong and six thin hook bristles on the cremaster.

Adults are on wing from March to September depending on the location.

The larvae feed on Apiaceae species.
