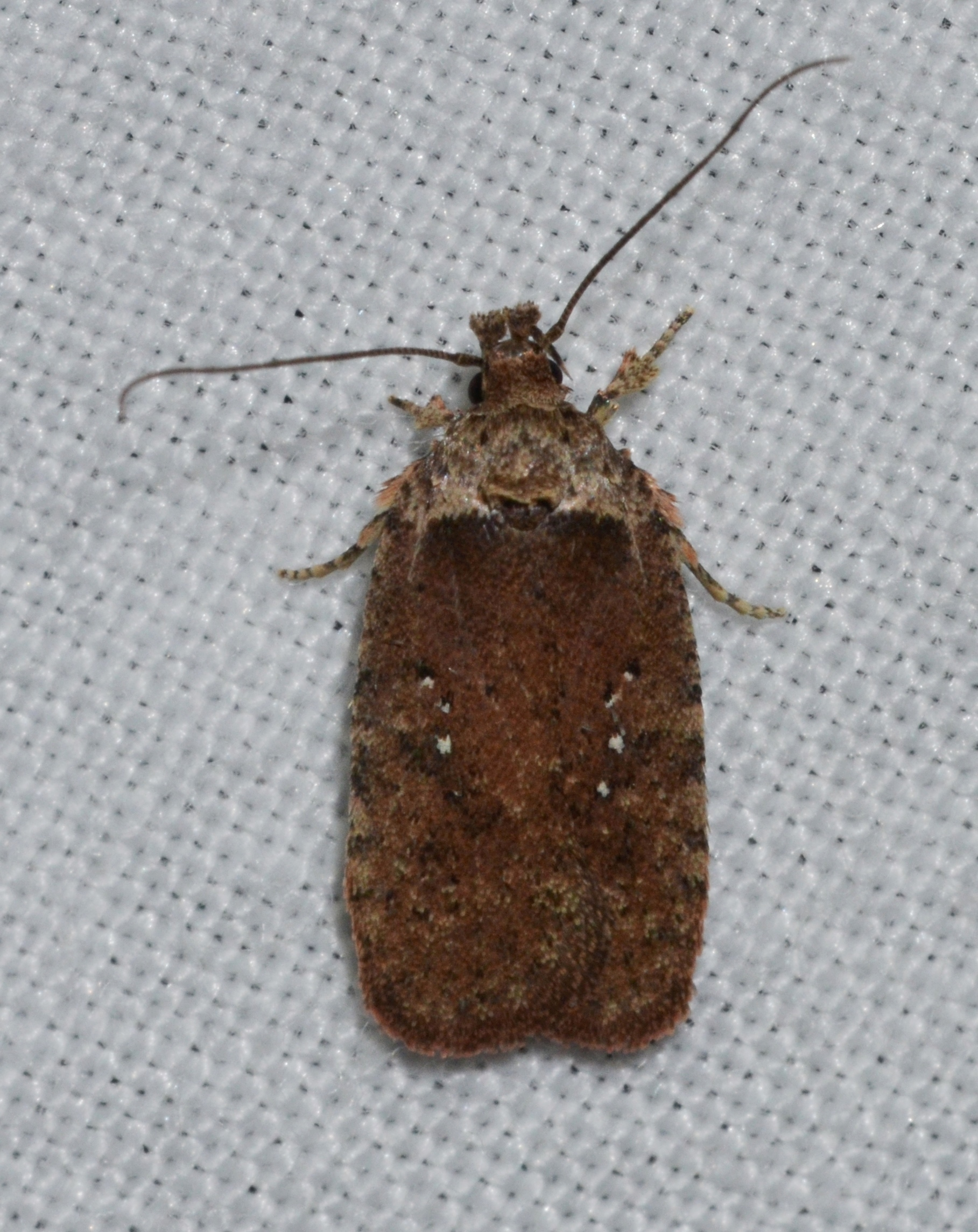

Scientific classification
- Kingdom: Animalia
- Phylum: Arthropoda
- Clade: Pancrustacea
- Class: Insecta
- Order: Lepidoptera
- Family: Depressariidae
- Genus: Agonopterix
- Species: A. clemensella

Binomial name
- Agonopterix clemensella (Chambers, 1876)

Synonyms
- Gelechia clemensella Chambers, 1876

= Agonopterix clemensella =

Species of moth

Agonopterix clemensella is a moth of the family Depressariidae. It is found in eastern North America, where it has been recorded from Arkansas, Illinois, Indiana, Kentucky, Maine, Michigan, Minnesota, Mississippi, Missouri, Ohio, Oklahoma, Ontario, Pennsylvania, Tennessee, Vermont, Virginia, West Virginia and Wisconsin. The habitat consists of damp woods and meadows.

The wingspan is about 19 mm.

The larvae feed on various Umbelliferae species, including Sanicula odorata, Osmorhiza longistylis, Zizia aptera, Pastinaca sativa and Heracleum mantegazzianum. The species overwinters as an adult.
