= Papaipema harrisii =

Scientific classification
- Kingdom: Animalia
- Phylum: Arthropoda
- Class: Insecta
- Order: Lepidoptera
- Superfamily: Noctuoidea
- Family: Noctuidae
- Genus: Papaipema
- Species: P. harrisii

Binomial name
- Papaipema harrisii (Grote, 1881)

Species of moth

Papaipema harrisii, known generally as the cow parsnip borer moth or heracleum stem borer, is a species of cutworm or dart moth in the family Noctuidae. It is found in North America.

The MONA or Hodges number for Papaipema harrisii is 9472.
