= International Committee of the Red Cross Library =

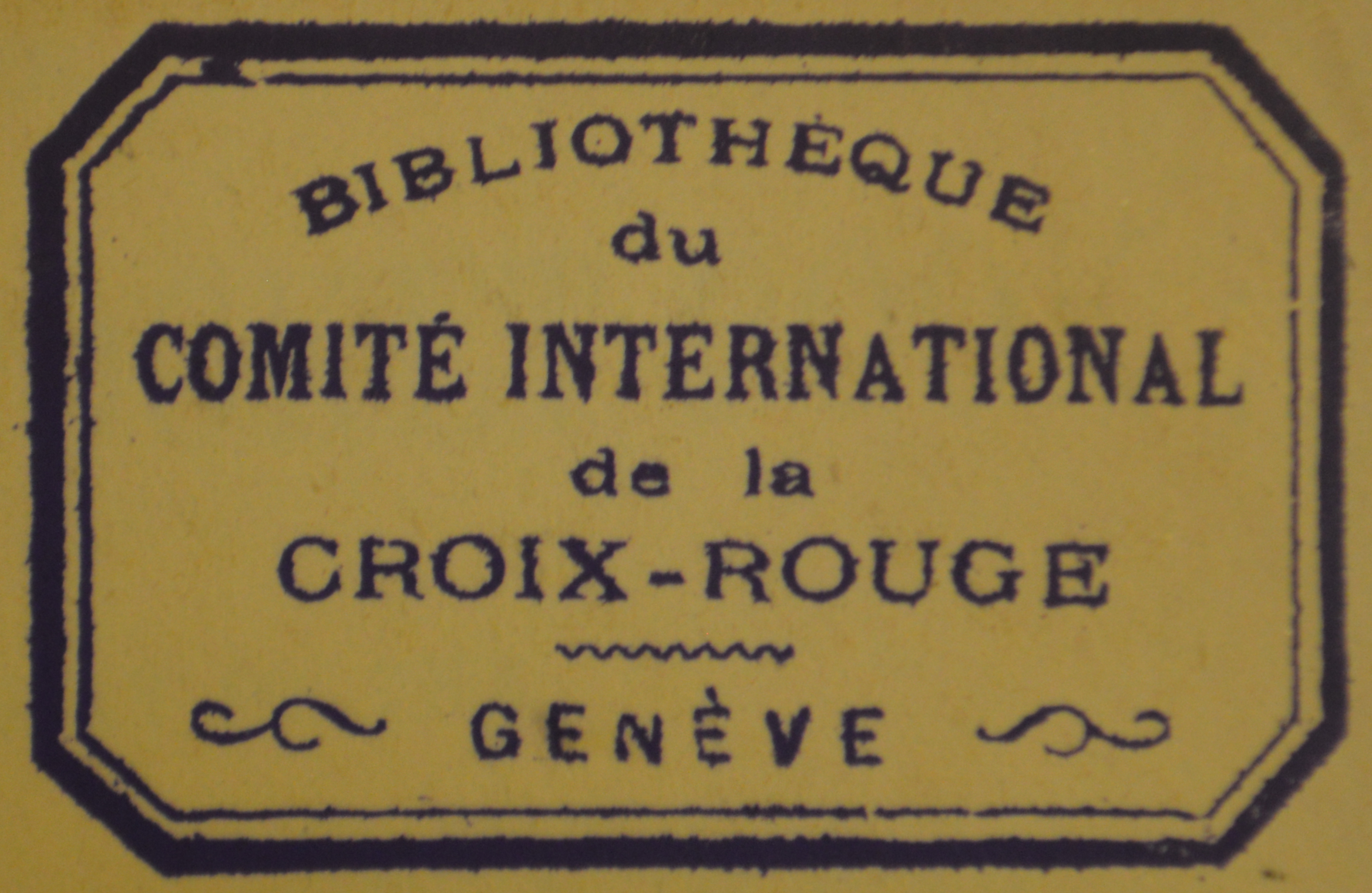
- Location: ICRCHQ, Geneva, Switzerland
- Type: memory institution, public library, Research library
- Established: February 17, 1863

Other information
- Website: https://www.icrc.org/en/library

The library of the International Committee of the Red Cross (ICRC) – in French: la bibliothèque du Comité international de la Croix-Rouge (CICR) – is a public library based at the headquarter of the international organization in Geneva, Switzerland. It was apparently founded around the time of the ICRC's inception in 1863.

The library in its self-description is "the leading documentary resource" on the ICRC in particular and International humanitarian law (IHL) in general, along with the ICRC Archives. It plays a central role for the mandate of the ICRC according to article 4 (g) of its Statutes

"to work for the understanding and dissemination of knowledge of international humanitarian law applicable in armed conflicts and to prepare any development thereof".

== History ==
=== The early period: Ancien Fonds ===
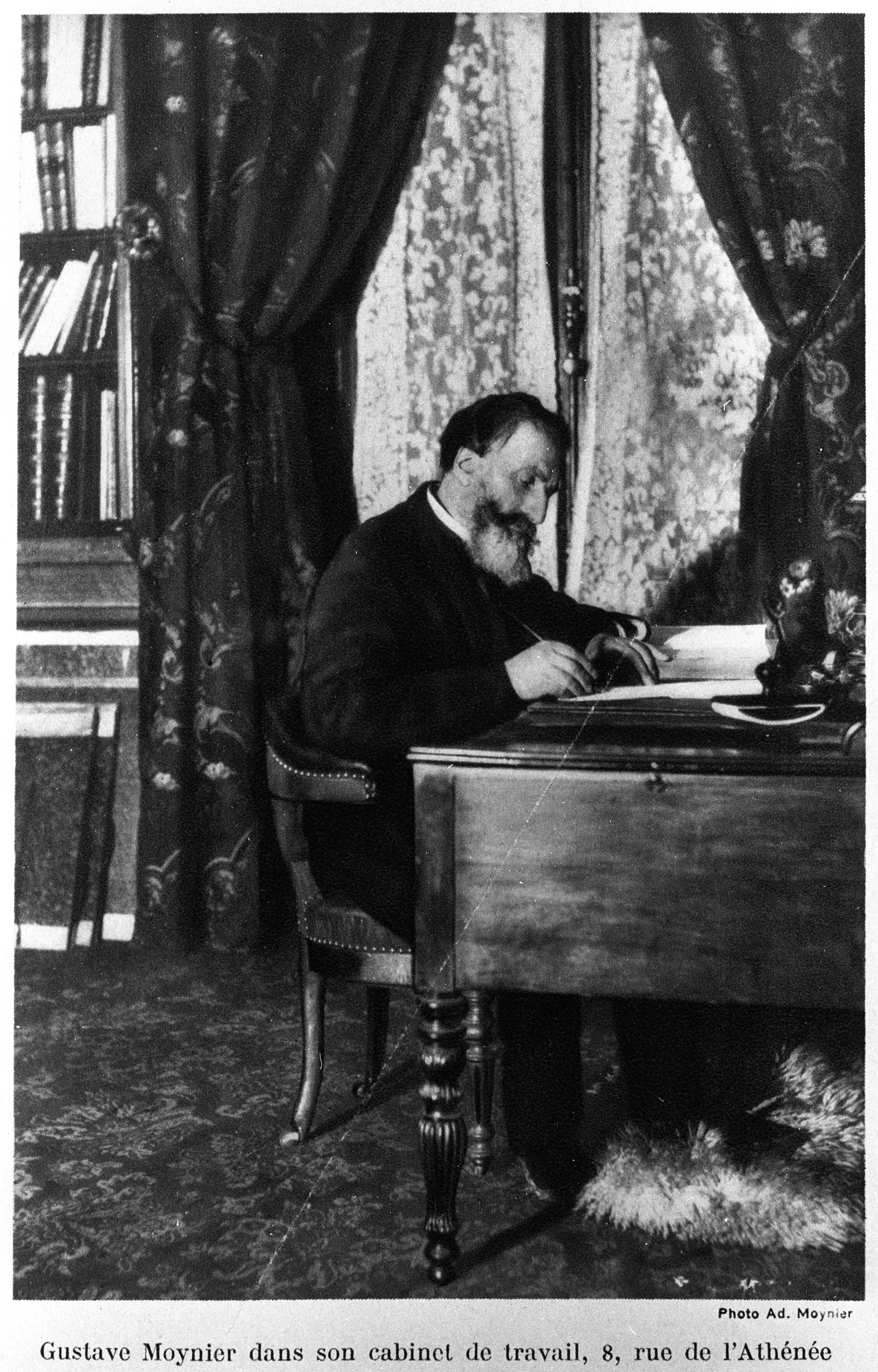
Moynier at his private residence in Rue de l'Athénée 8, photographed by his son Adolphe, who was also treasurer of the ICRC

The ICRC – or rather its predecessor, the International Committee for Relief to the Wounded – was founded in February 1863 in Geneva by five men: businessman-turned-activist Henry Dunant, who had laid out the basic ideas in his much-acclaimed book A Memory of Solferino; lawyer and philanthropist Gustave Moynier; the medical doctors Louis Appia and Théodor Maunoir; and the General Guillaume Henri Dufour. The exact date of the creation of the library is unknown. It is first mentioned in the records of 1875, but

"we may suppose that it was born at the same time as the organization, initially perhaps simply taking the form of a collection of works belonging to the Committee’s founders."

The actual address of the newly founded Red Cross – and thus at least a part of its fledgling library – became Dunant's private residence, the third floor of his family's "Maison Diodati" in the Old Town at Rue du Puits-Saint-Pierre 4. However, as Dunant's colonial businesses in Algeria collapsed, he declared bankruptcy in 1867 and was pushed out of the ICRC by its president Moynier in the following year. It may be assumed that Dunant's collection of ICRC-related publications was transferred to Moynier's splendid city residence in Rue de l'Athénée No. 8, since he was clearly the driving force behind the creation of a library.

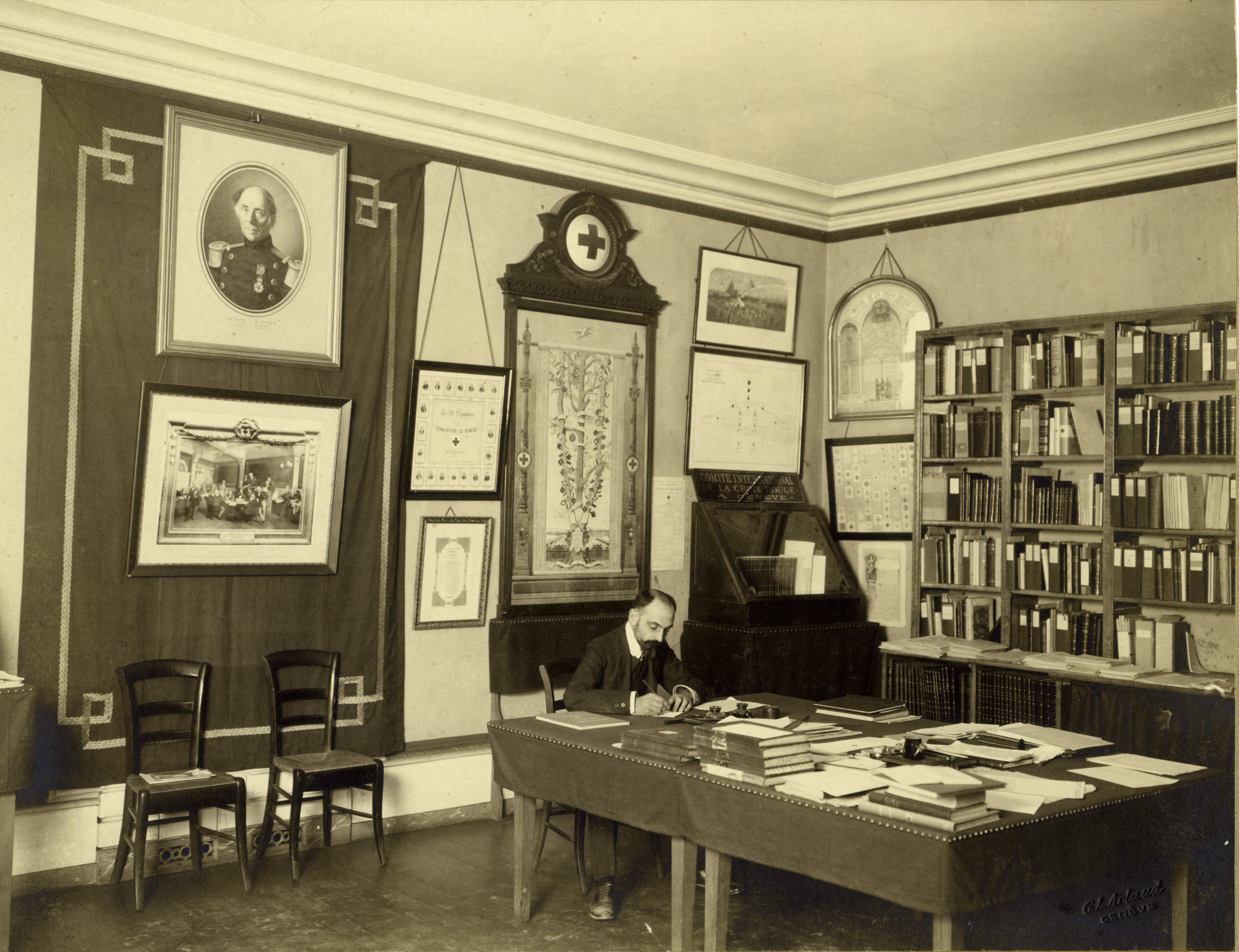
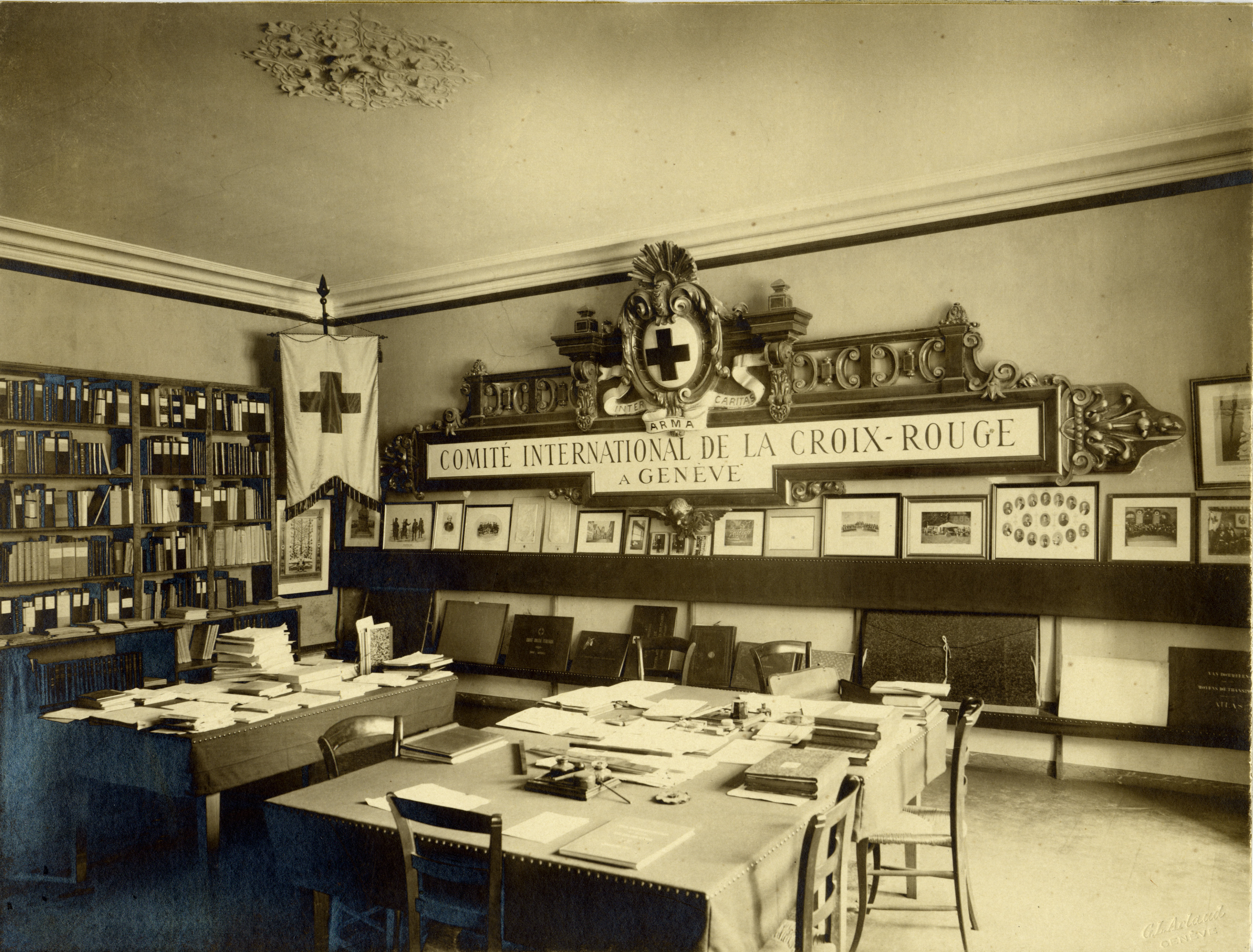
Paul des Gouttes (left) at a desk in the library and museum room of Rue de l'Athénée 3, 1900

In 1871, the ICRC moved into an apartment of a building at Rue de l'Athénée No. 3, just across the street from Moynier's splendid town residence in Rue de l'Athénée No. 8. While it was a very representative address, the office spaces were still rather modest with just three rooms. One of them served both as library and museum.

In 1878, Moynier declared that the library should be accessible to all. In the same year he completely reorganized its collections and wrote himself by a hand a new catalog.

"The Heritage Collection remains to this day organized according to the classification system that he set up. Items are shelved first by source, then by subject, author and date of publication. This Classification system makes it possible to follow the spread of Red Cross action across the world and the creation of a network of National Societies first in Europe and then further afield. The largest number of items in the Heritage Collection come from Germany, Switzerland, France, Italy and the United Kingdom. As well, the Collection includes publications from China, Cuba, Brazil, the United States and Mexico, and even one from a short-lived micro-nation, the Free State of Counani."

As the Red Cross movement and the collections of its library expanded, the aging Moynier delegated some administrative tasks like the management of the library upon the recommendation of his nephew and future successor, Gustave Ador, to Paul Des Gouttes, a lawyer, who was appointed the secretary of the Committee in 1898. He was a nephew of Moynier's as well.

=== Post-World War I ===
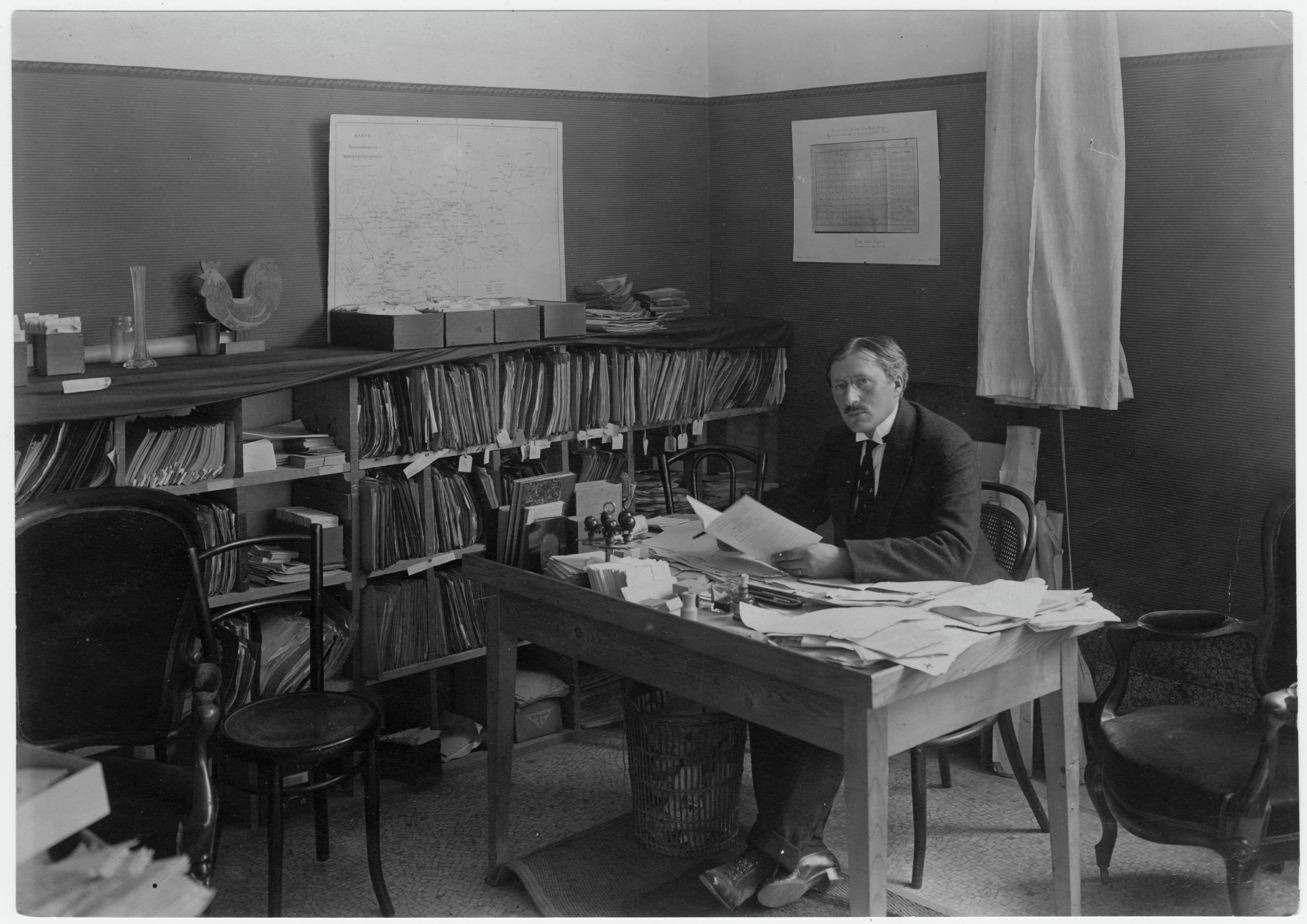
Étienne Clouzot during WWI at the musée Rath, where he also published a news bulletin for the International Prisoners of War Agency

Shortly after the end of the First World War, the ICRC moved to its new headquarters at the Promenade du Pin at the edge of the Old Town. The library was accommodated there next to a large vestibule. The responsibility for the library was now taken over by Étienne Clouzot, an archivist palaeographer, who was also a columnist for the liberal daily newspaper Journal de Genève. During WWI he had designed the classification system for the millions of index cards. In 1919 he succeeded Des Gouttes as head of the ICRC Secretariat and in that position gave the library a great boost, especially by establishing a systematic exchange of publications with the national societies of the Red Cross Movement.

In June 1933, the ICRC moved its headquarters away from the Old Town and – "by a curious turn in history" – into the splendid Villa Moynier in the quarter of Sécheron. It had been built in 1848 for the banker Barthélemy Paccard and was then owned by his son-in-law Gustave Moynier, who had stayed in that office for a record-term of 47 years until his death in 1910. Situated in the middle of the large Parc Moynier on the shores of Lake Geneva, the Villa had housed the League of Nations in 1926. The city of Geneva then acquired it and rented it out to the ICRC. A room on the ground floor was reserved for the library next to the museum room and the meeting hall. However, this "eccentric" location and a lack of staff assigned to it made the library effectively dormant.

=== Post-World War II ===
In 1946 the ICRC moved its headquarters from the Villa Moynier to the former Carlton Hotel in the quarter of Pregny. The neoclassical building on a hill above the Palace of Nations was provided to the organisation by the Canton of Geneva through a long-term lease. The library was assigned a "modest" place. Two years later, in 1948, the new collection, which had been added to the Heritage Collection since 1919, was completely reorganised and catalogued.

However, it was only a quarter of a century later, in 1972, that the governing body of the ICRC assigned a more prominent room to the library. At the same time, it raised its status and confirmed the mandate to not only preserve Red Cross publications, but also to comprehensively acquire IHL publications. Ten years later, a thesaurus-based reference system was introduced which allowed users easier access to documents.

In 1987, the library moved into the newly constructed building no. 3 (level −2) next to the Carlton. Two years later, a computerised catalogue system was established.

=== Post-1990 ===
The first computer with internet access was introduced in the reading hall in 1995. Five years later, the library catalogue became accessible through the intranet.

Since 2010, the ICRC Library, public archives and audiovisual archives have become part of the same unit, under the umbrella of the ICRC Archives and Information Management service. This administrative reform is part of the efforts to cope with the growing complexity of big data and at the same time the fragmentation of information due to the rapid evolution of digital technologies.

== Collections and Holdings ==
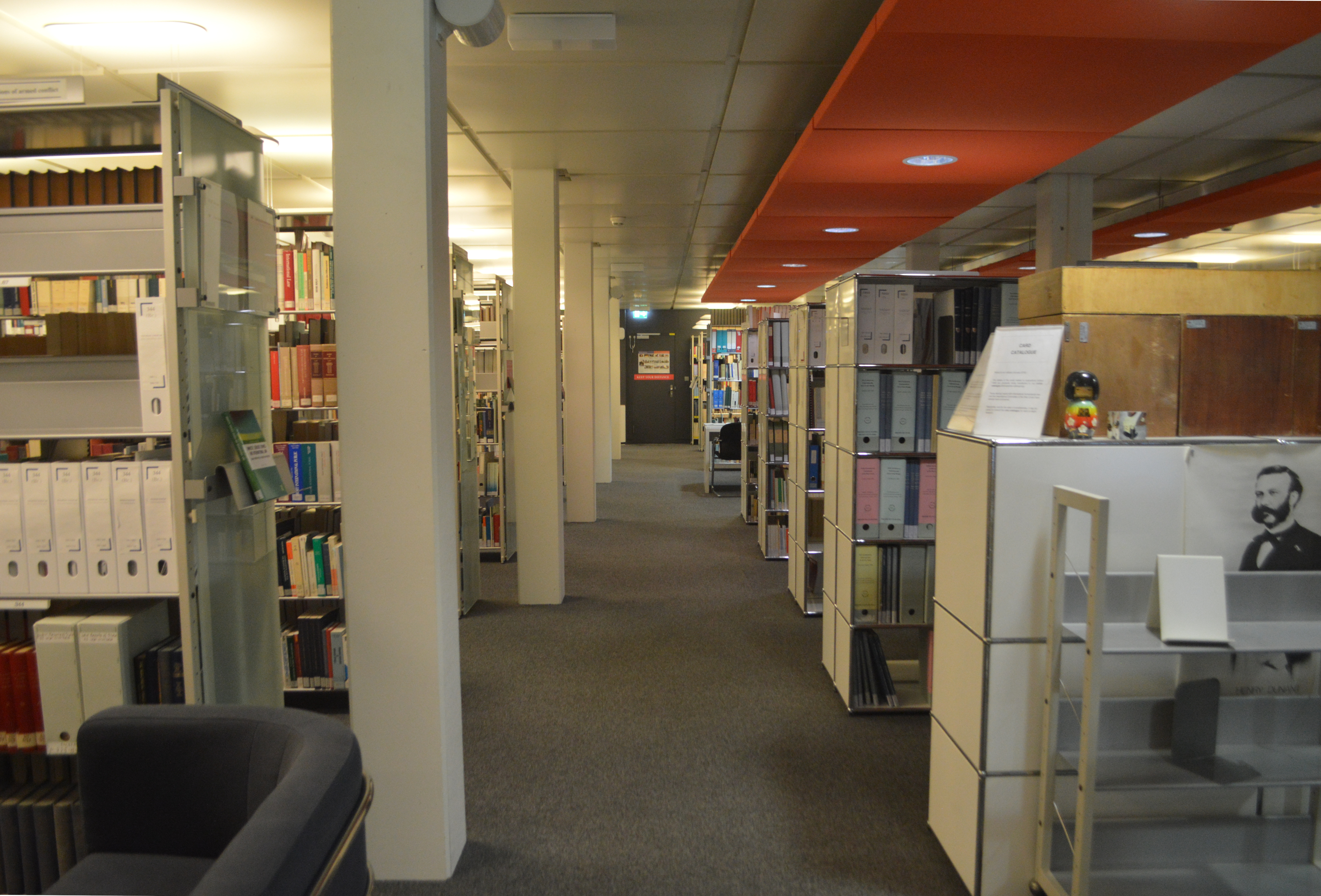
The reading room with a poster of Dunant on the right

The heritage collection of the ancien fonds (Signature: AF) comprises almost 4,000 books, brochures, reports, manuals and press cuttings from over forty countries.

Some members of the ICRC, first and foremost Gustave Moynier, contributed books from their private holdings to the library. The collection of Paul Des Gouttes was donated after his death in 1943 by his widow, including a copy of Un souvenir de Solférino from the first edition, which Dunant had limited to a total of 100 copies.

The library collections are constantly updated with new acquisitions covering IHL and the work of the organization.

As of early 2020, the ICRC library counted some 41,000 references in its catalogue. They include:

"preparatory documents, reports, records and minutes of Diplomatic Conferences where the main IHL treaties were adopted; records of Red Cross and Red Crescent Movement conferences, during which many IHL matters are discussed; every issue of the International Review of the Red Cross since it was founded; all ICRC publications; rare documents published in the period between the founding of ICRC and the end of the First World War and charting the influence of Dunant's ideas; and a unique collection of legislation and case law implementing IHL at domestic level."

== Galleries ==
=== The Heritage Collection ===
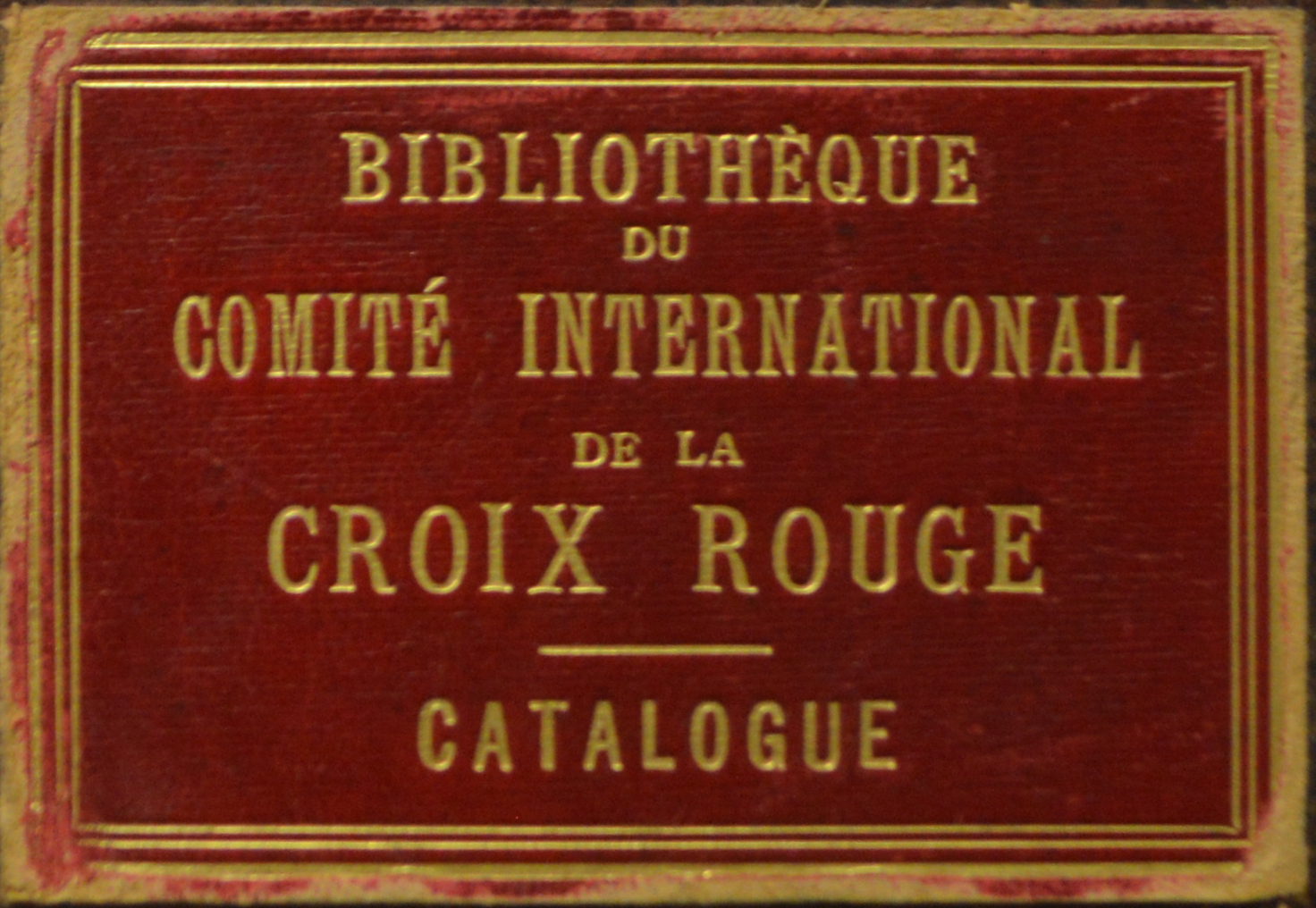

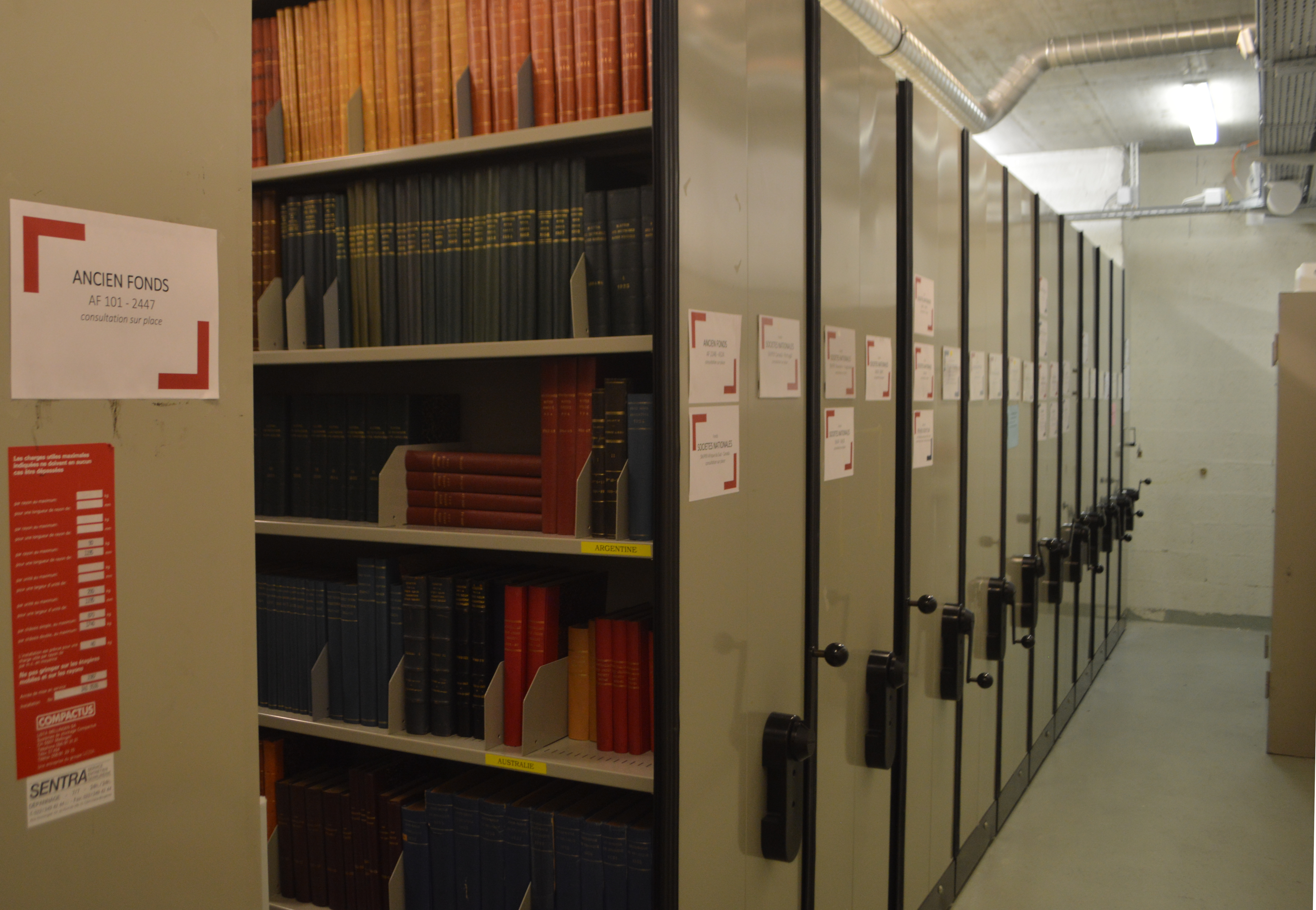

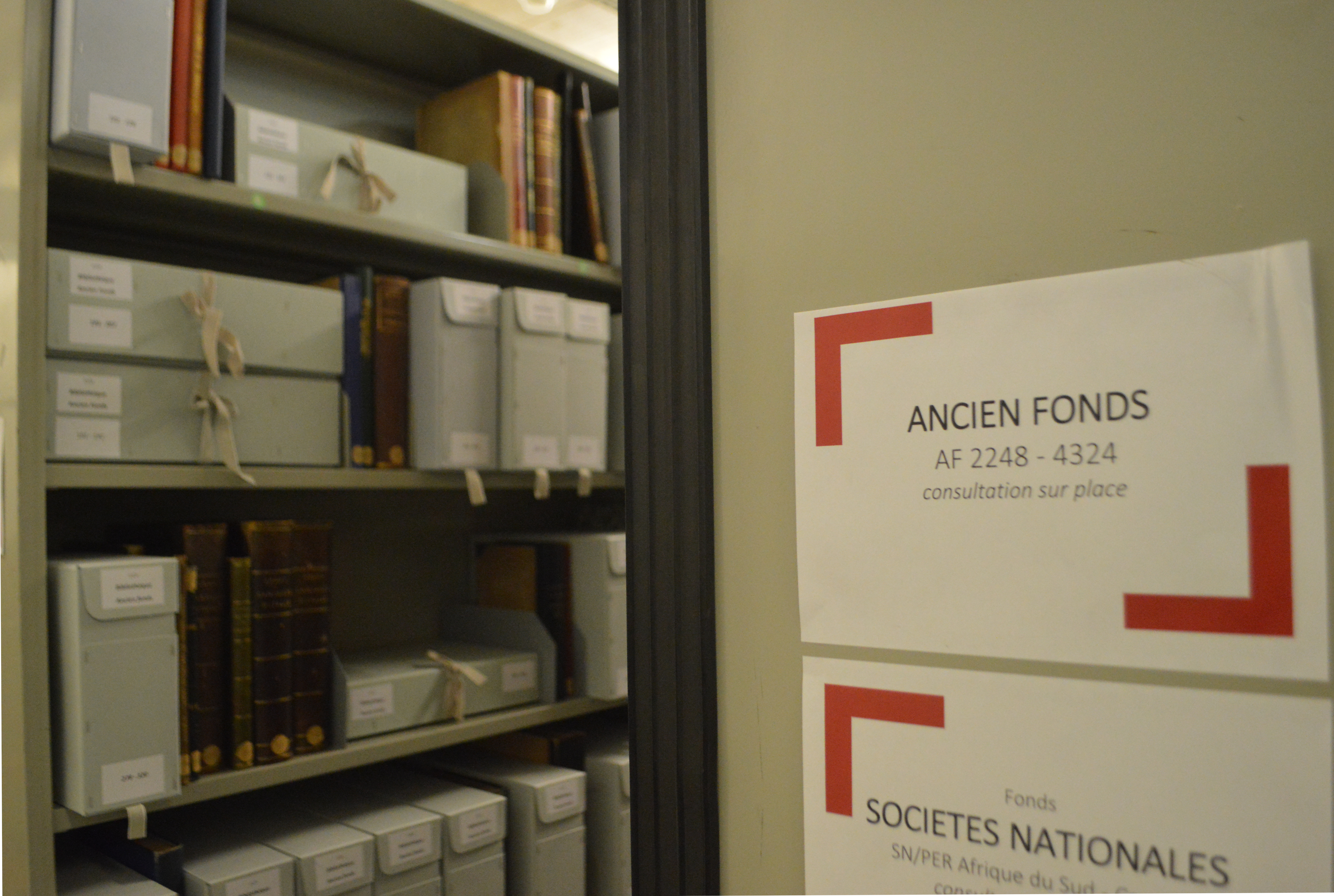

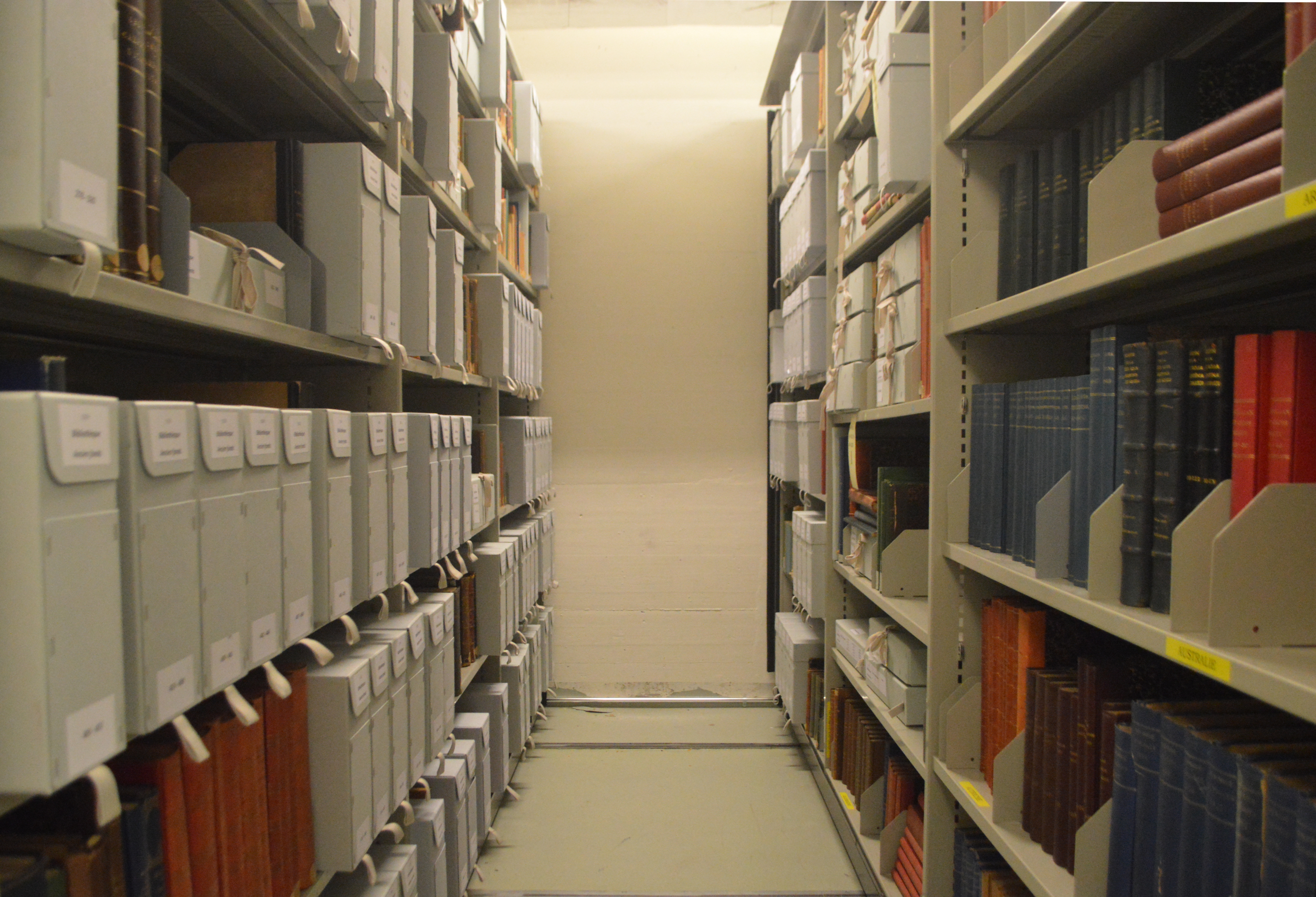

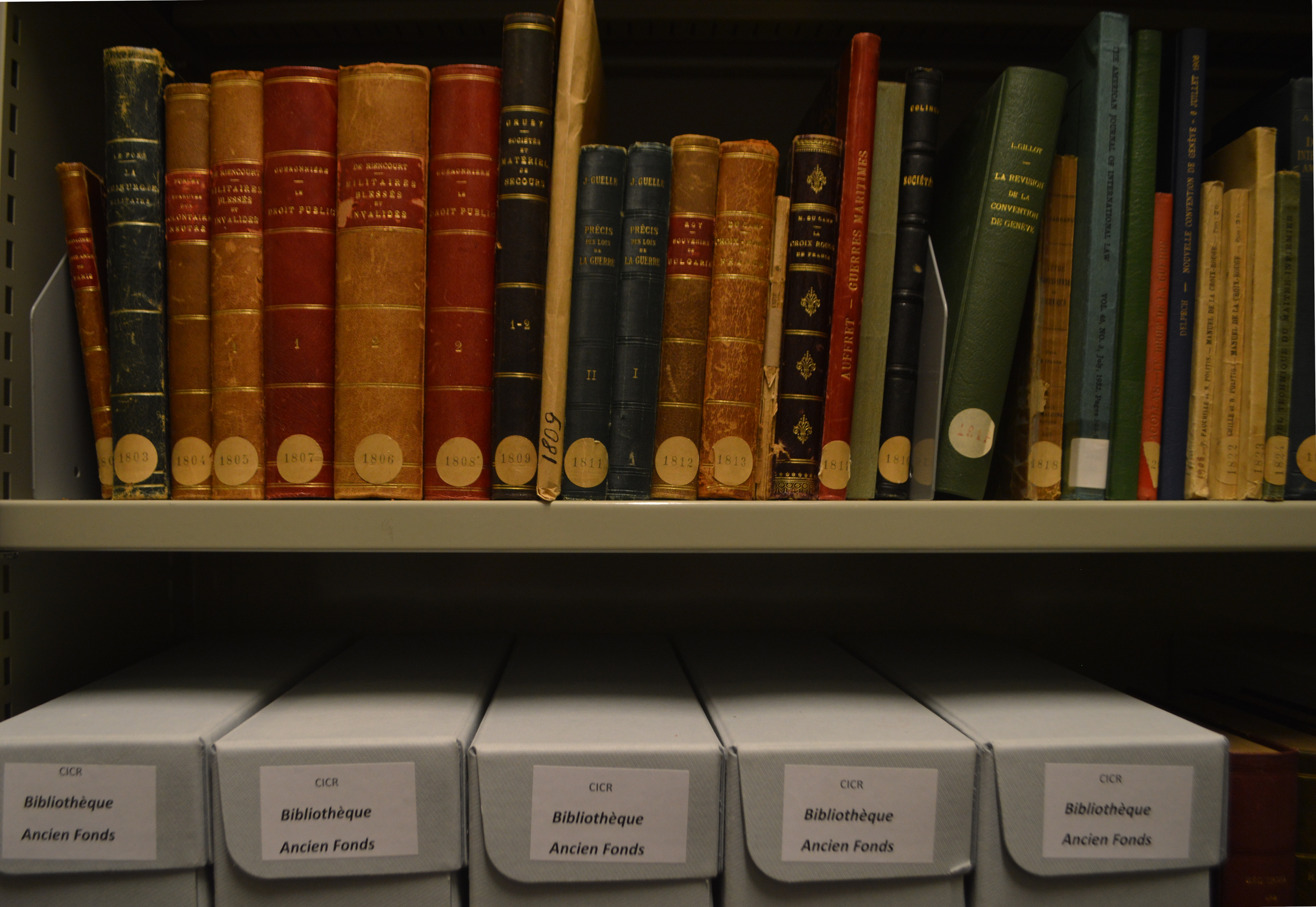

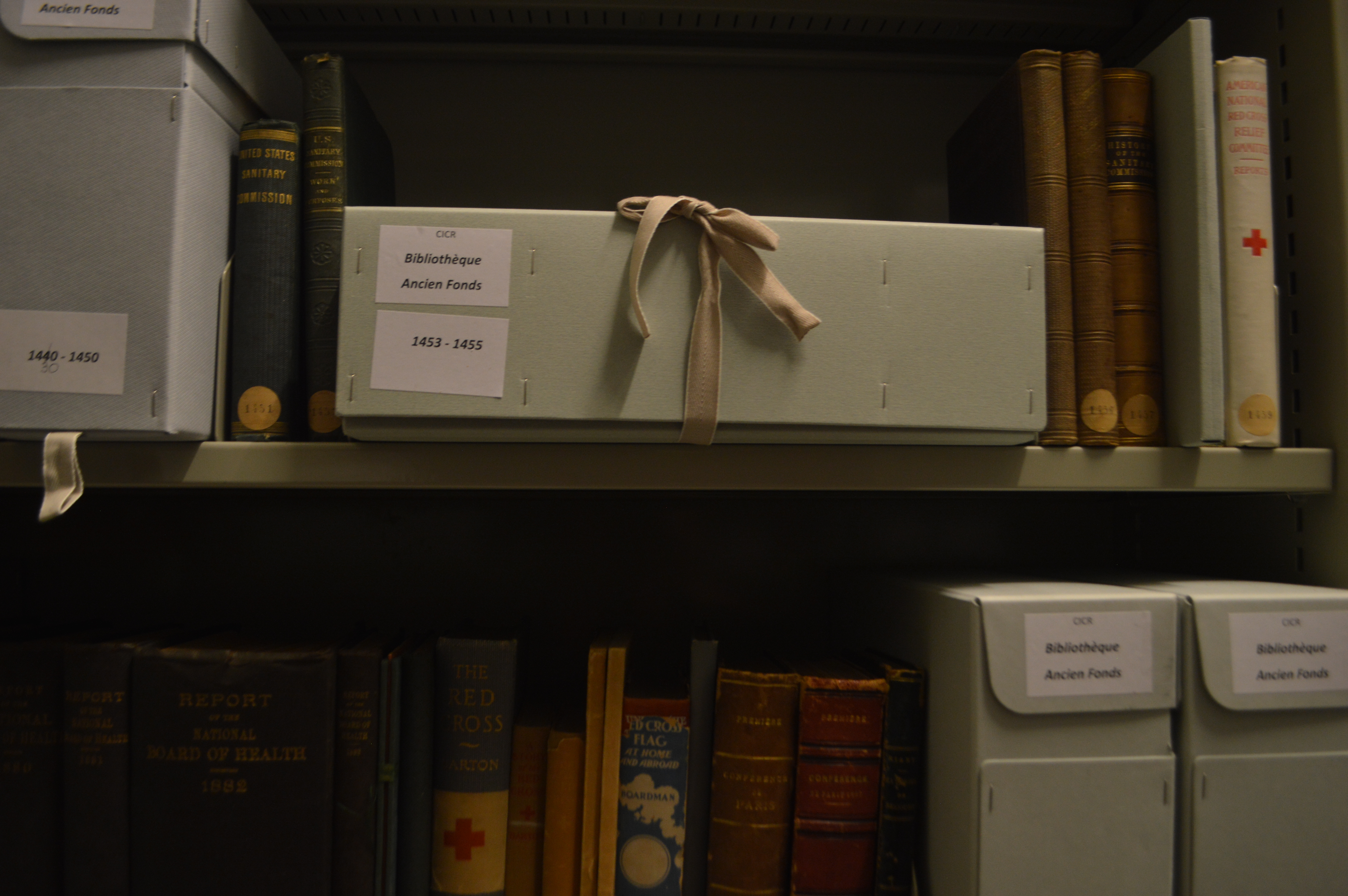

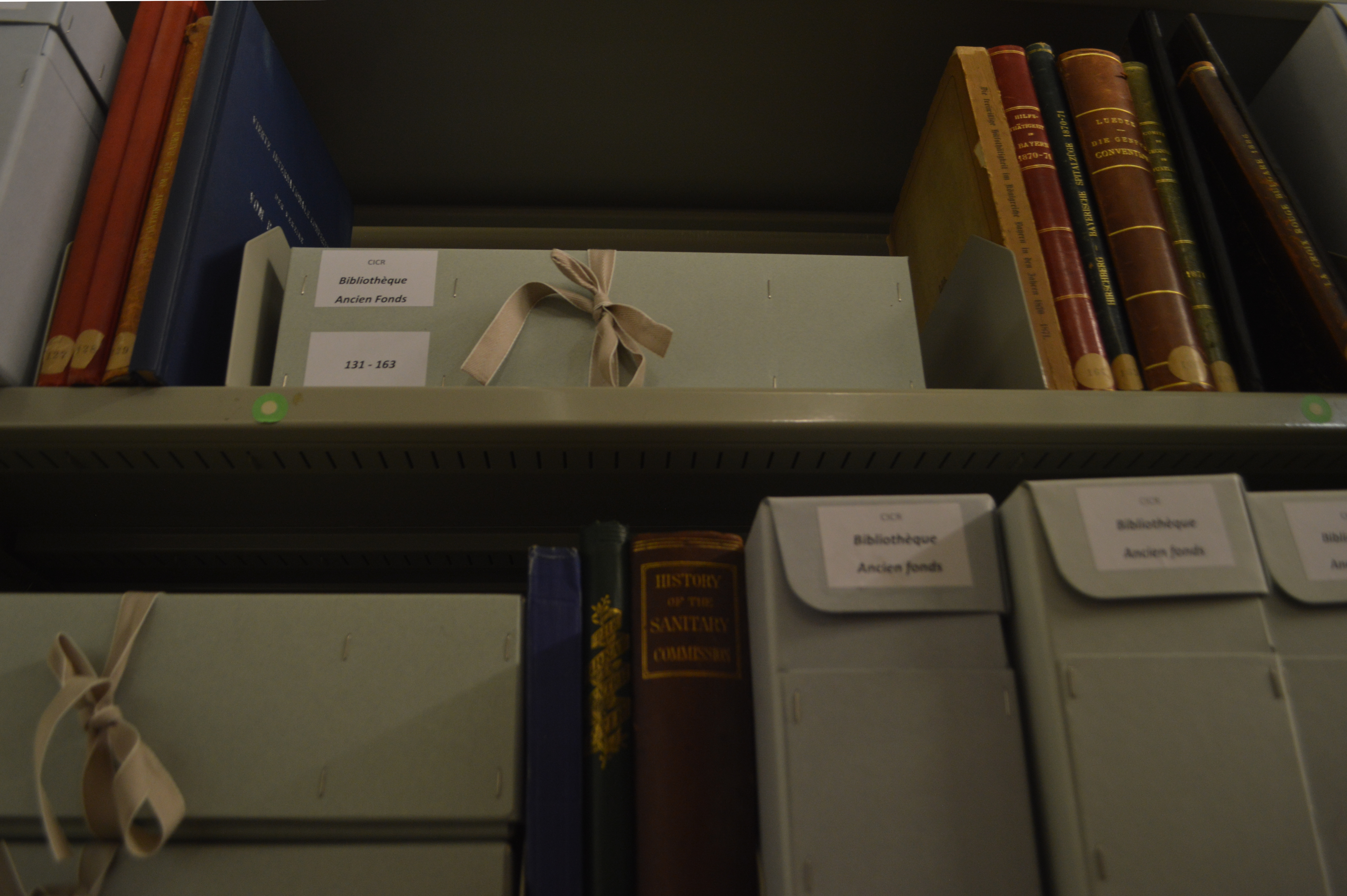

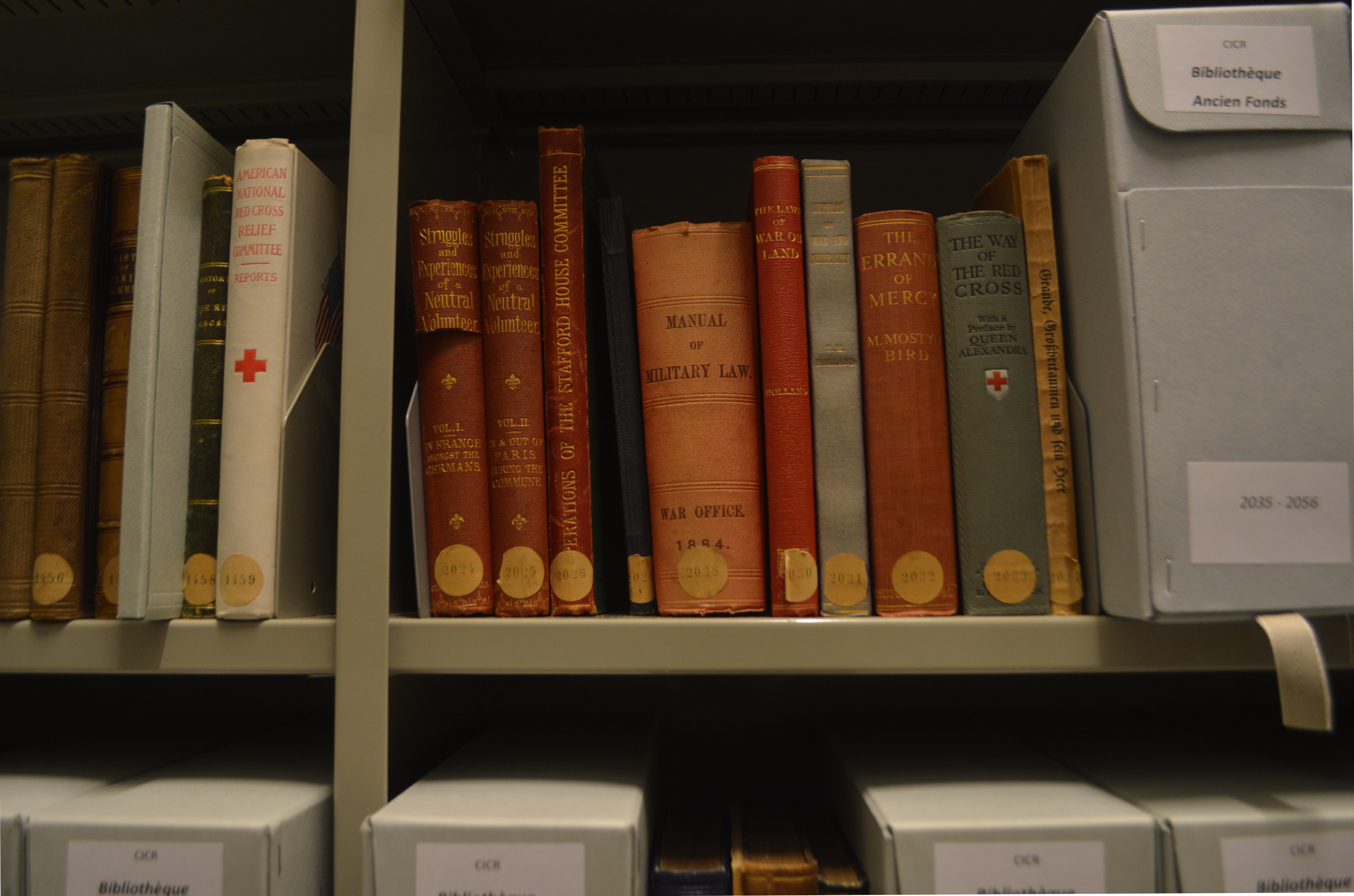

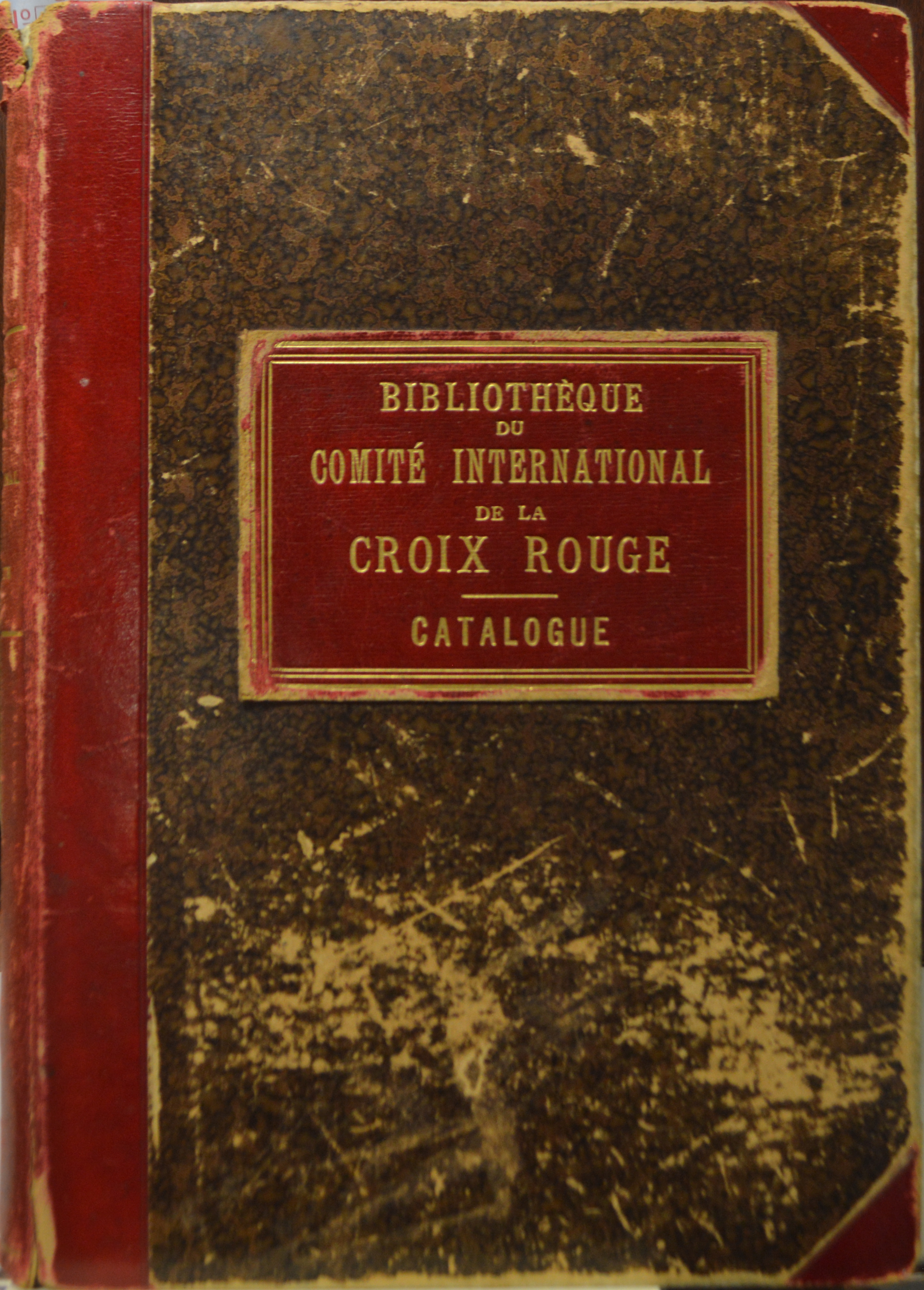
Cover of Moynier's handwritten catalog

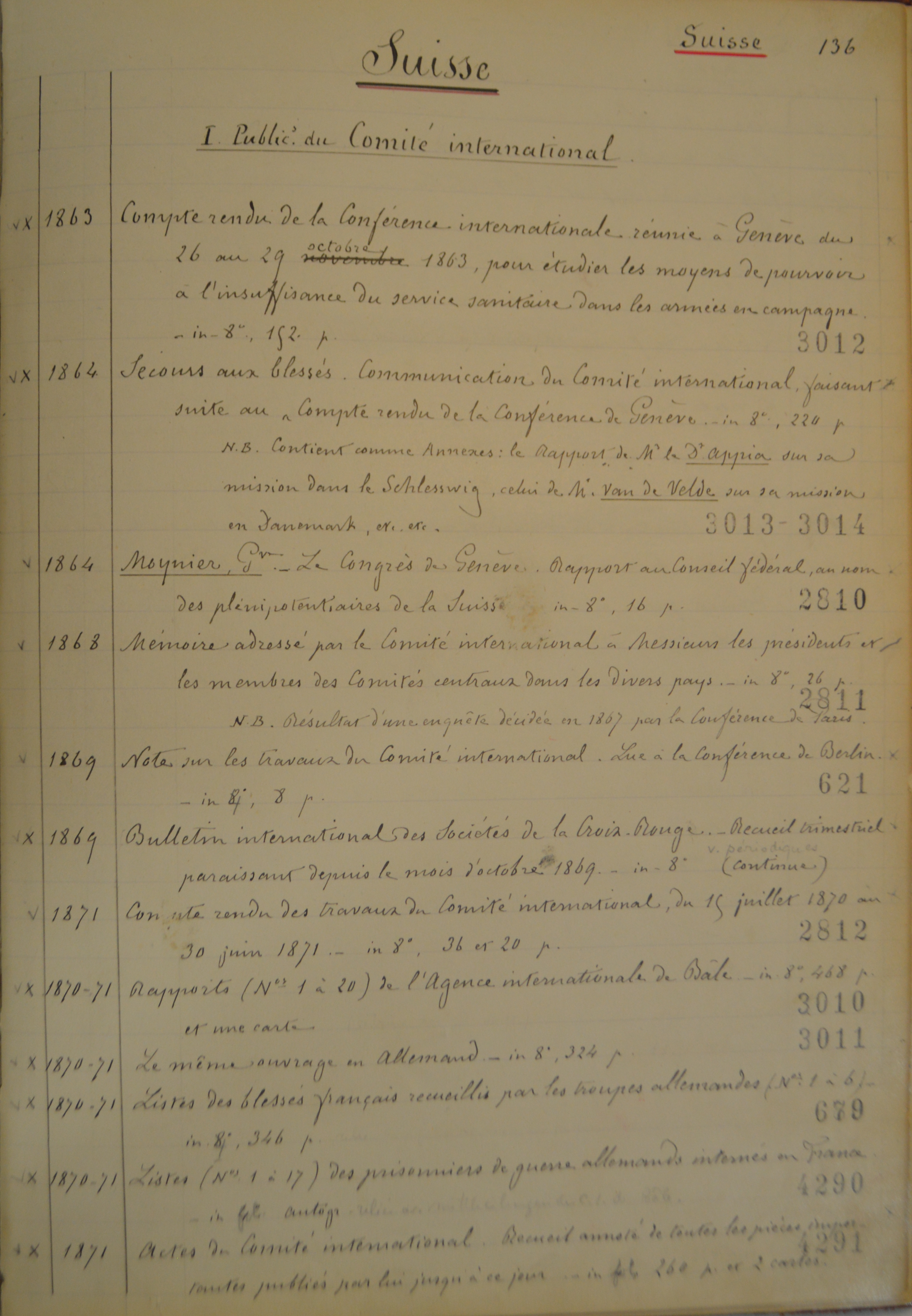
List of publications from Switzerland in the catalog

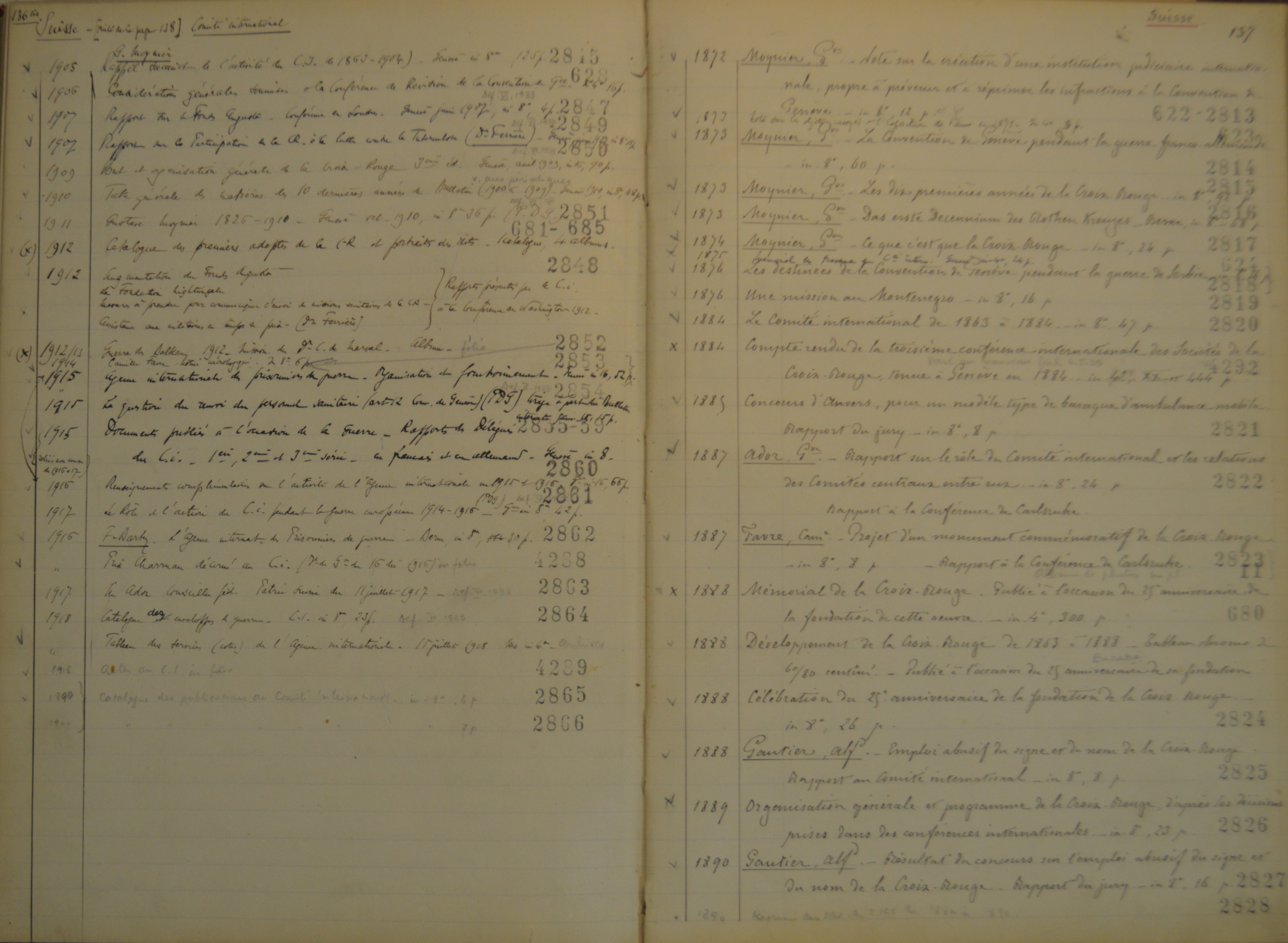
List of Moynier's own publications

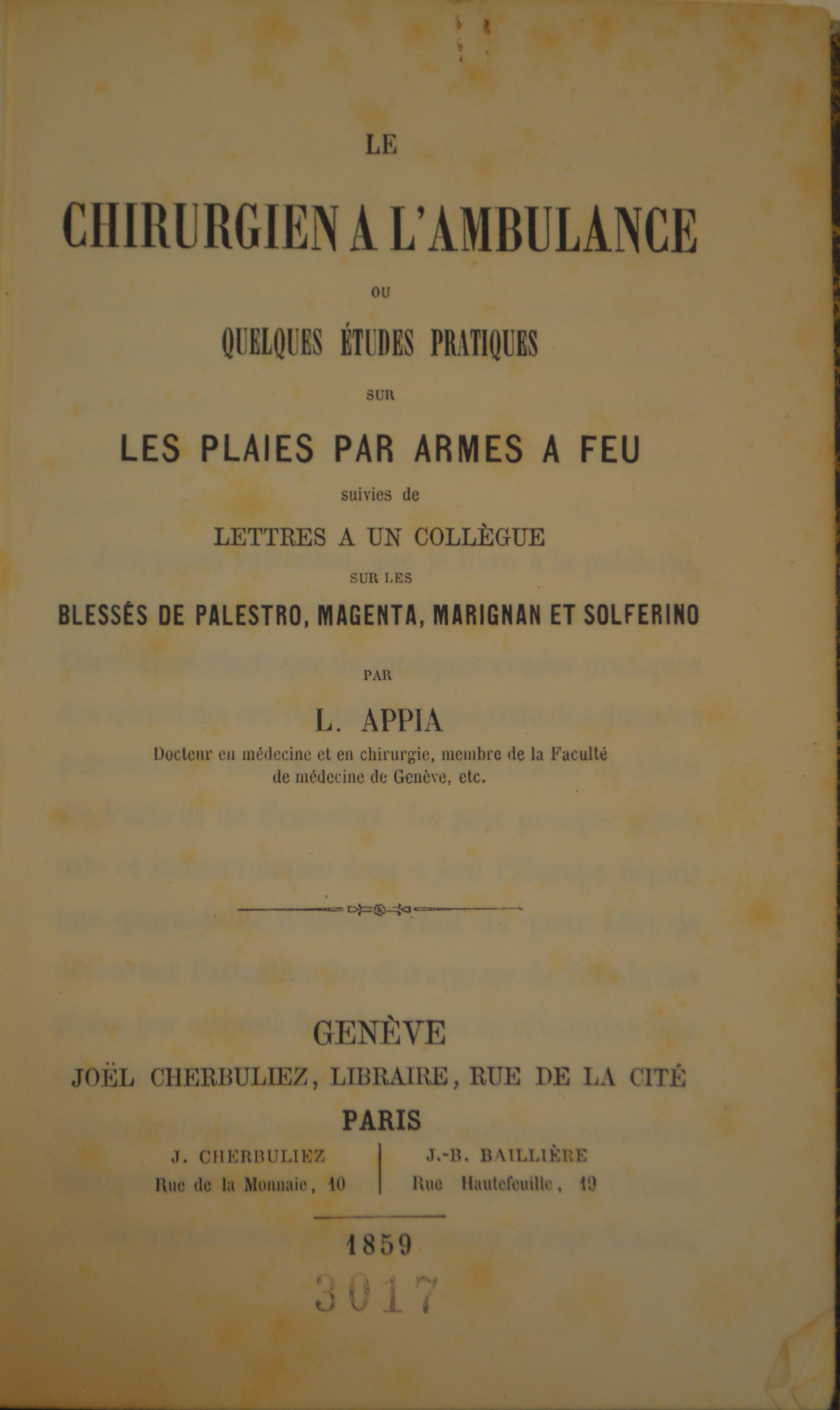
1859 book by co-founder Louis Appia

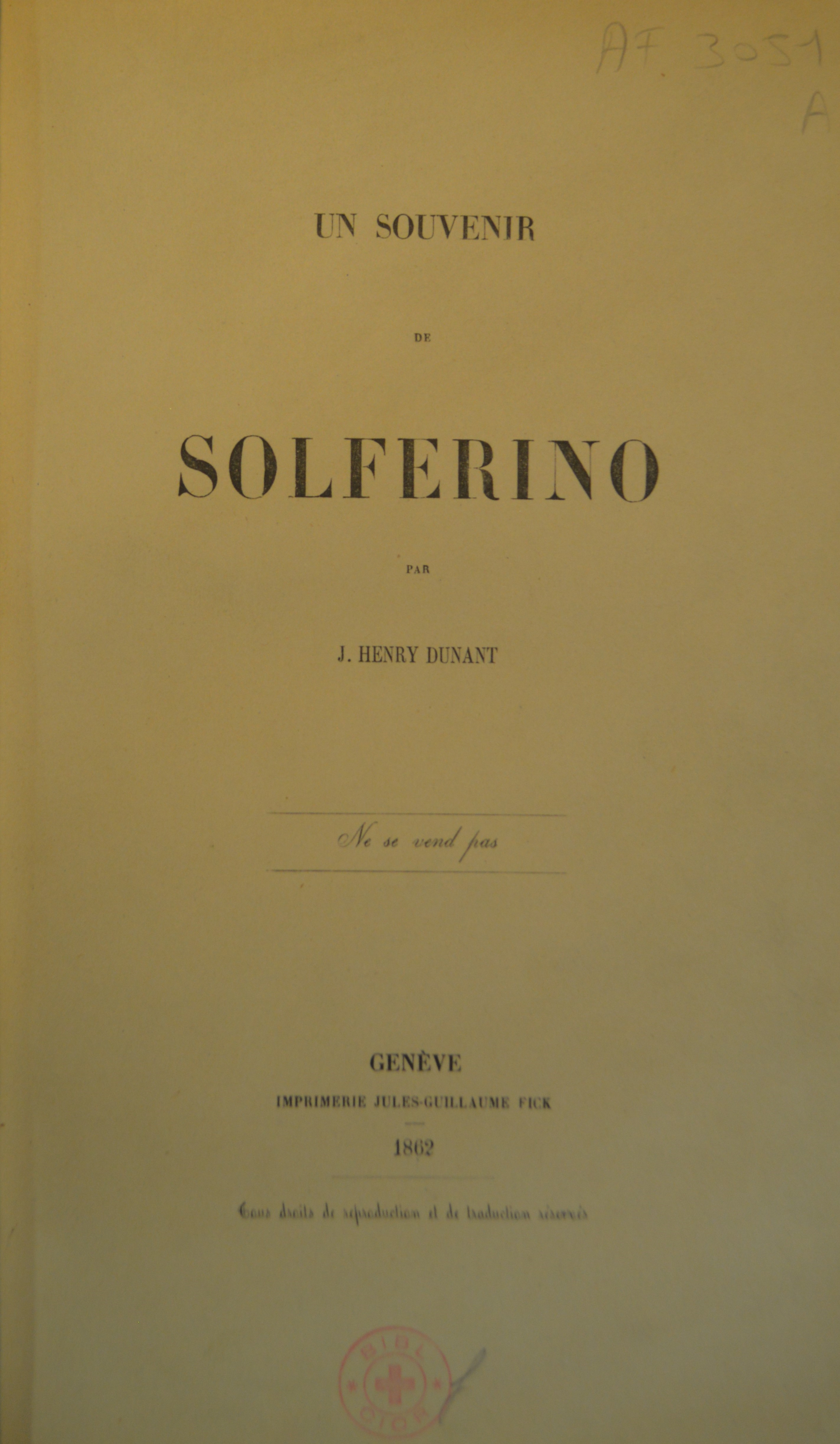
First edition of "Un Souvenir de Solferino" by Dunant

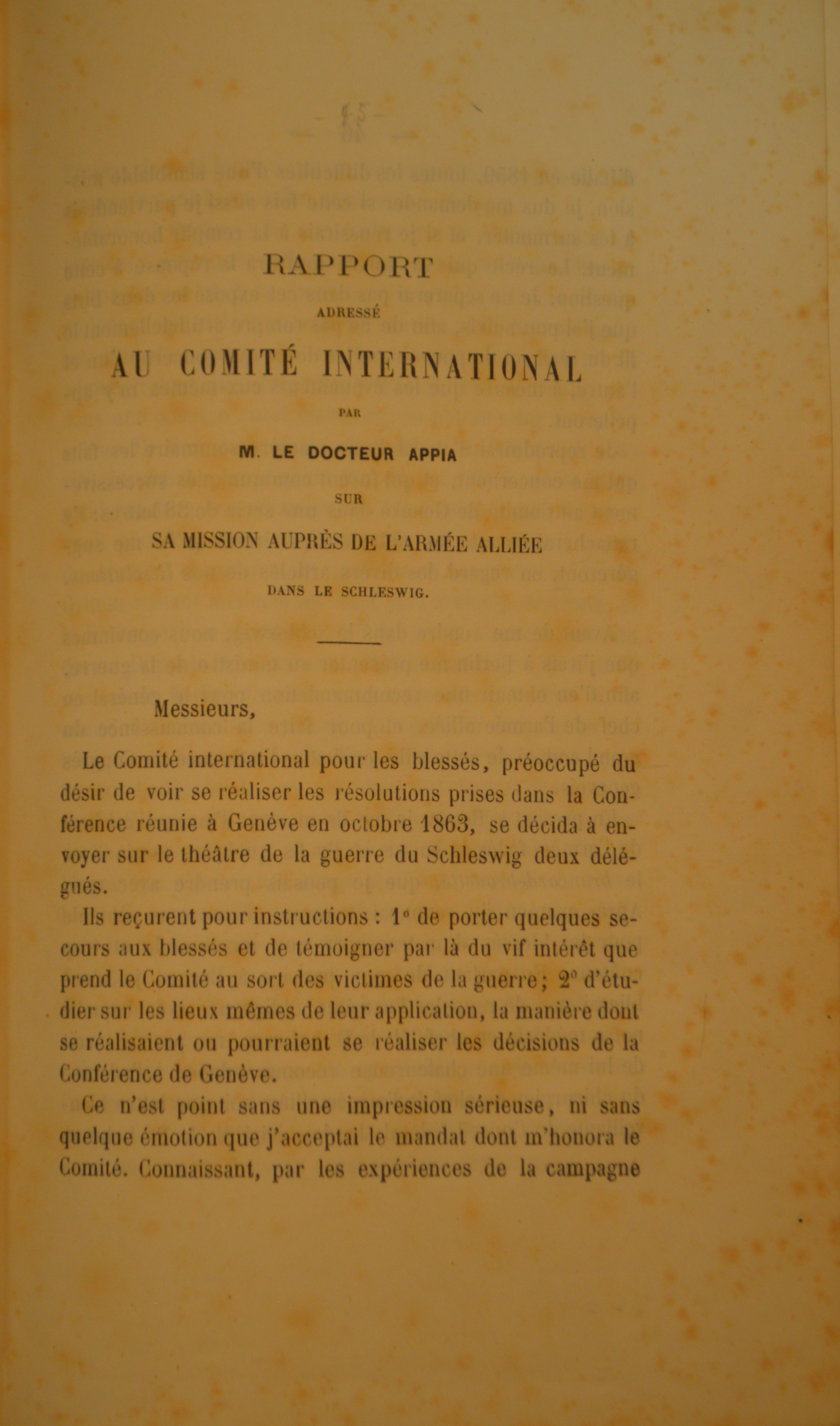
1864 report by Appia on the Second Schleswig War as first ICRC delegate ever

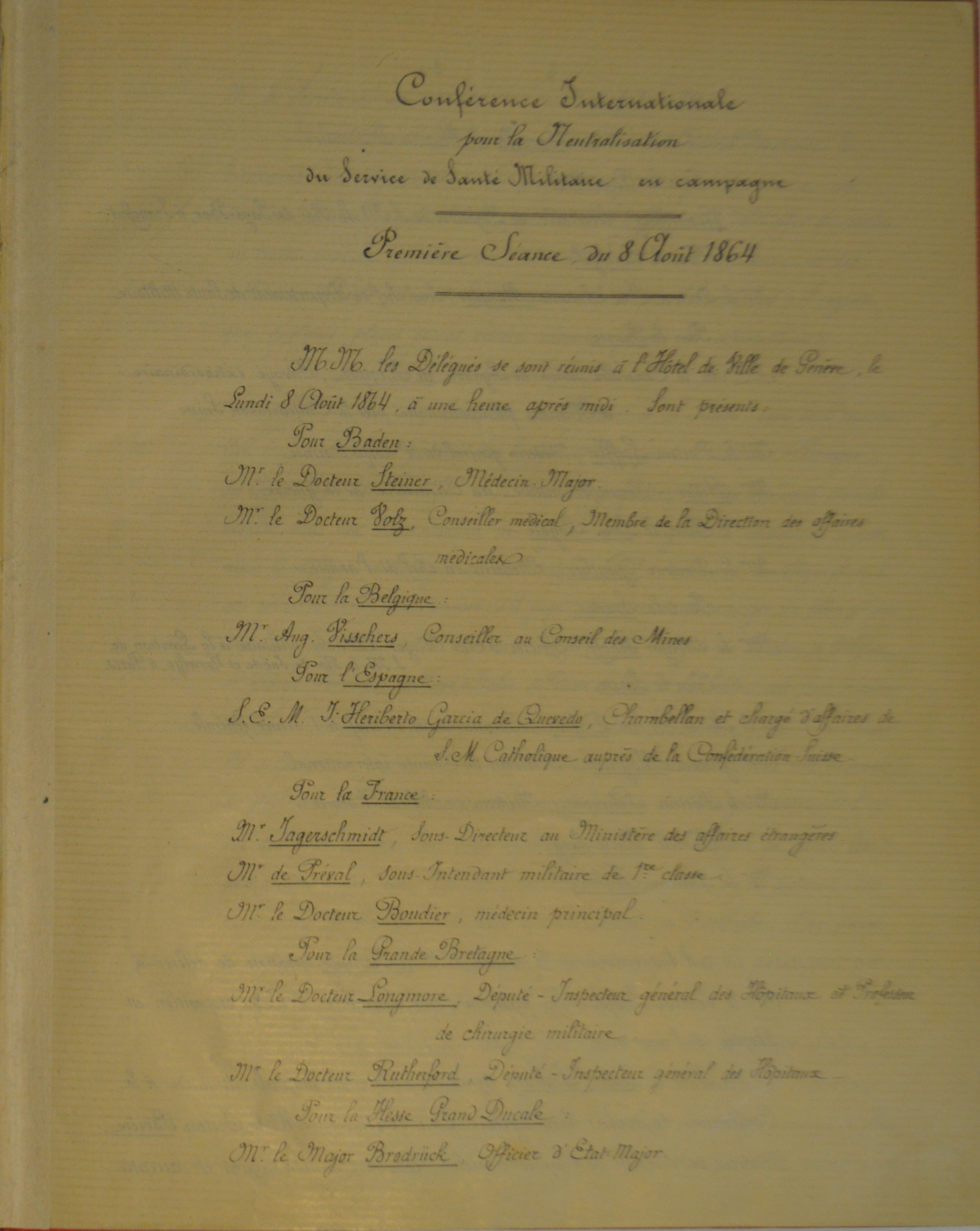
Proceedings of the 1864 conference that led to the First Geneva Convention

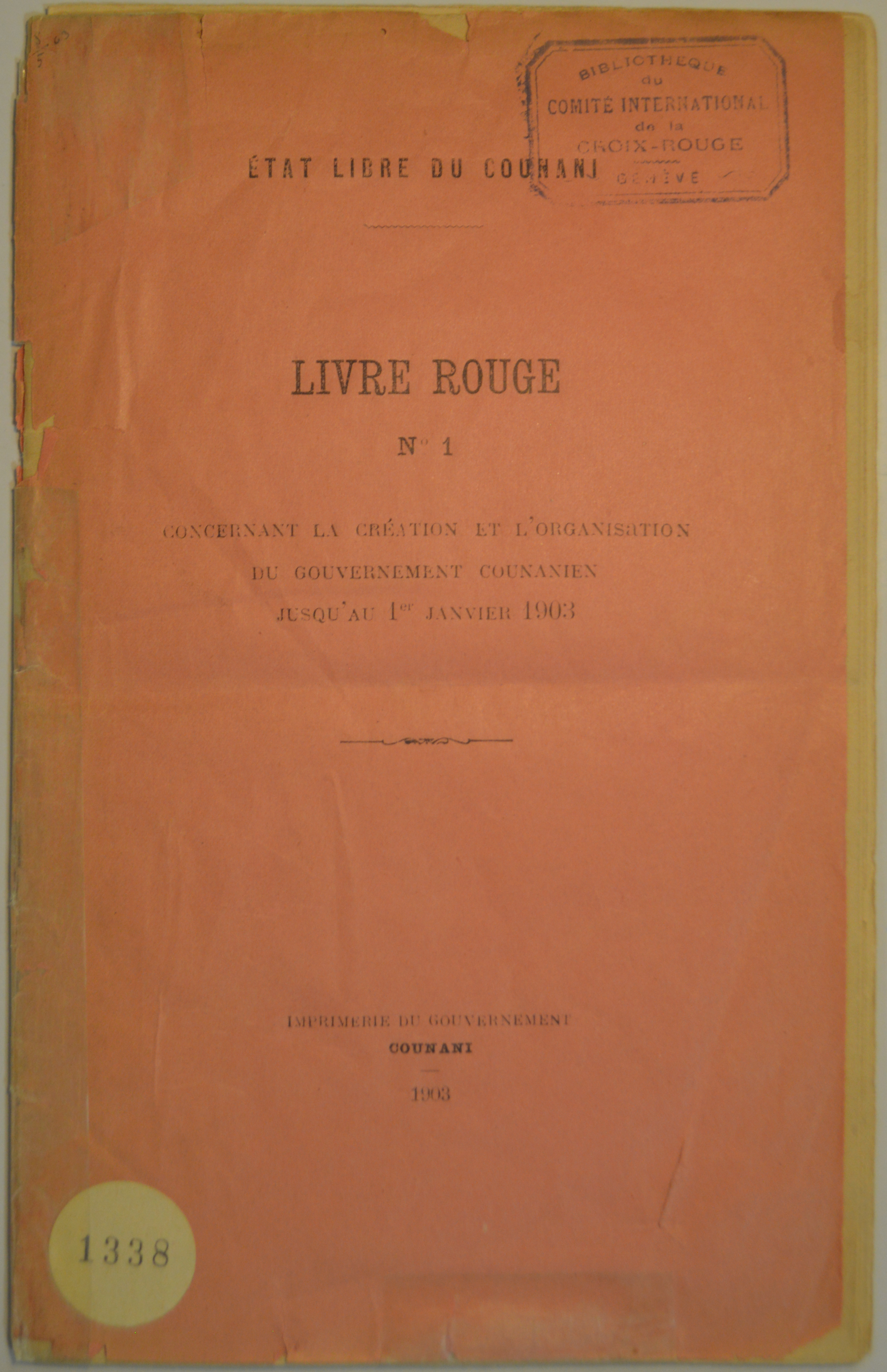
1903 "LIVRE ROUGE" by the government of Counani

=== POW journals from WWI ===
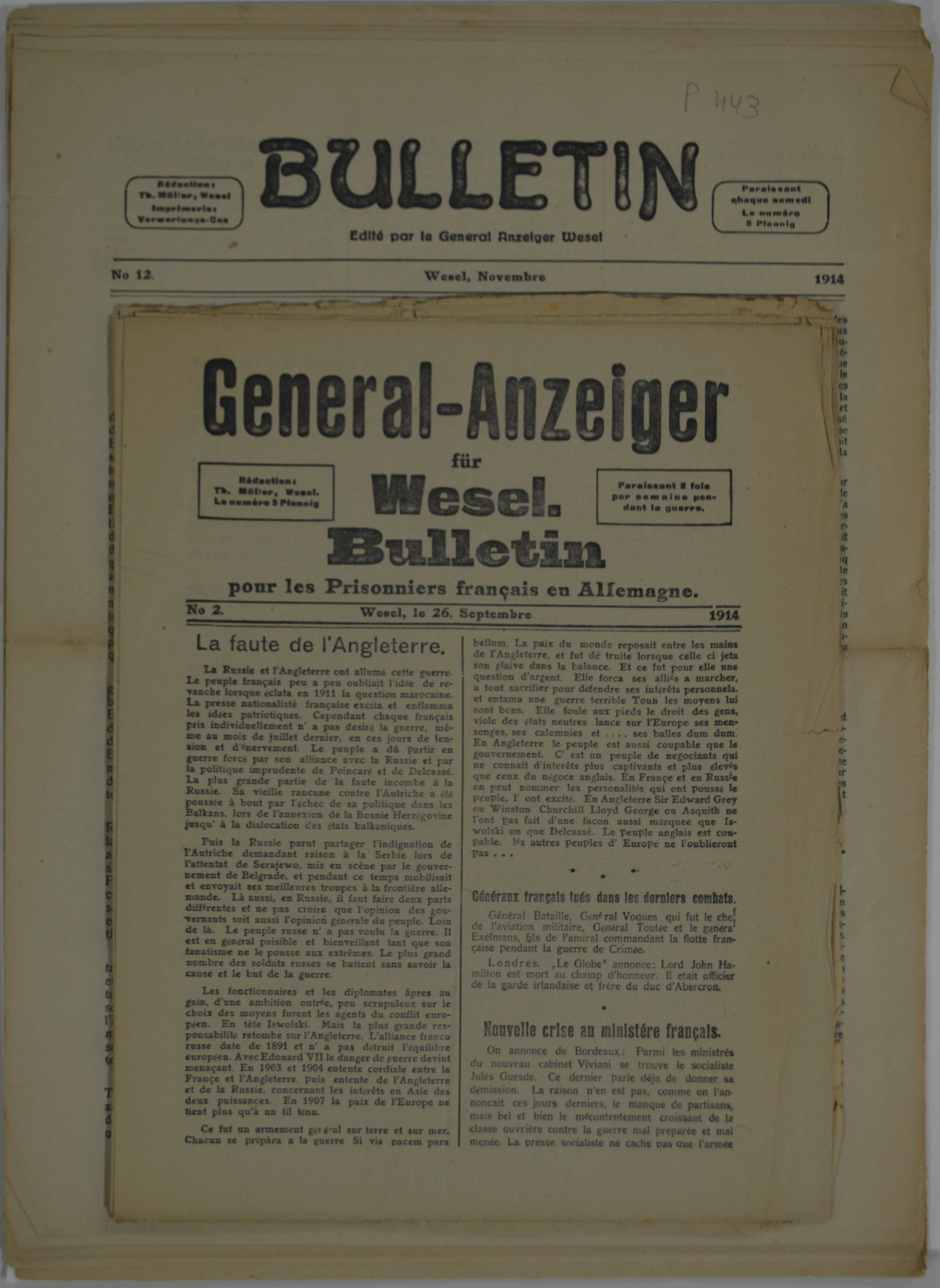

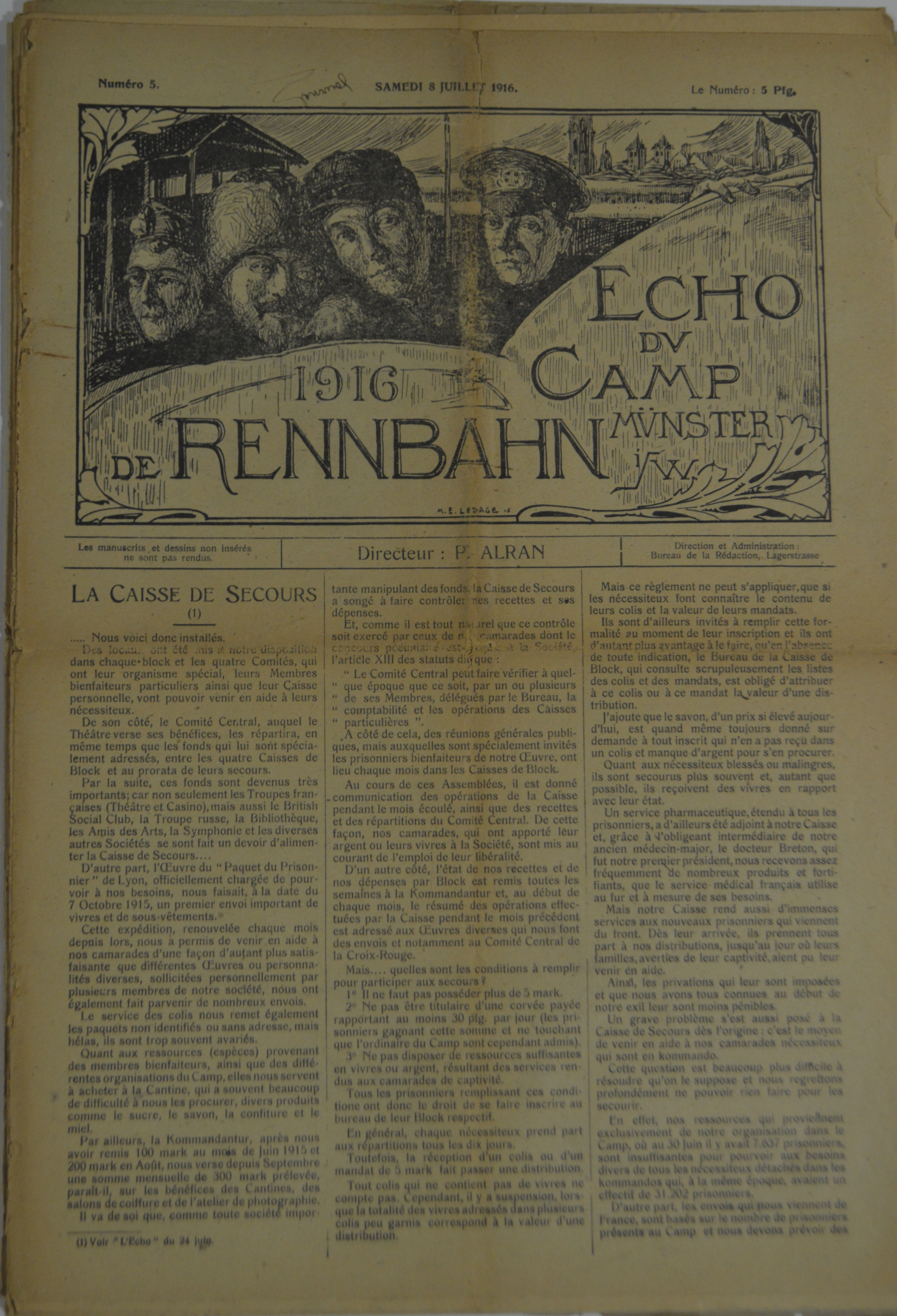

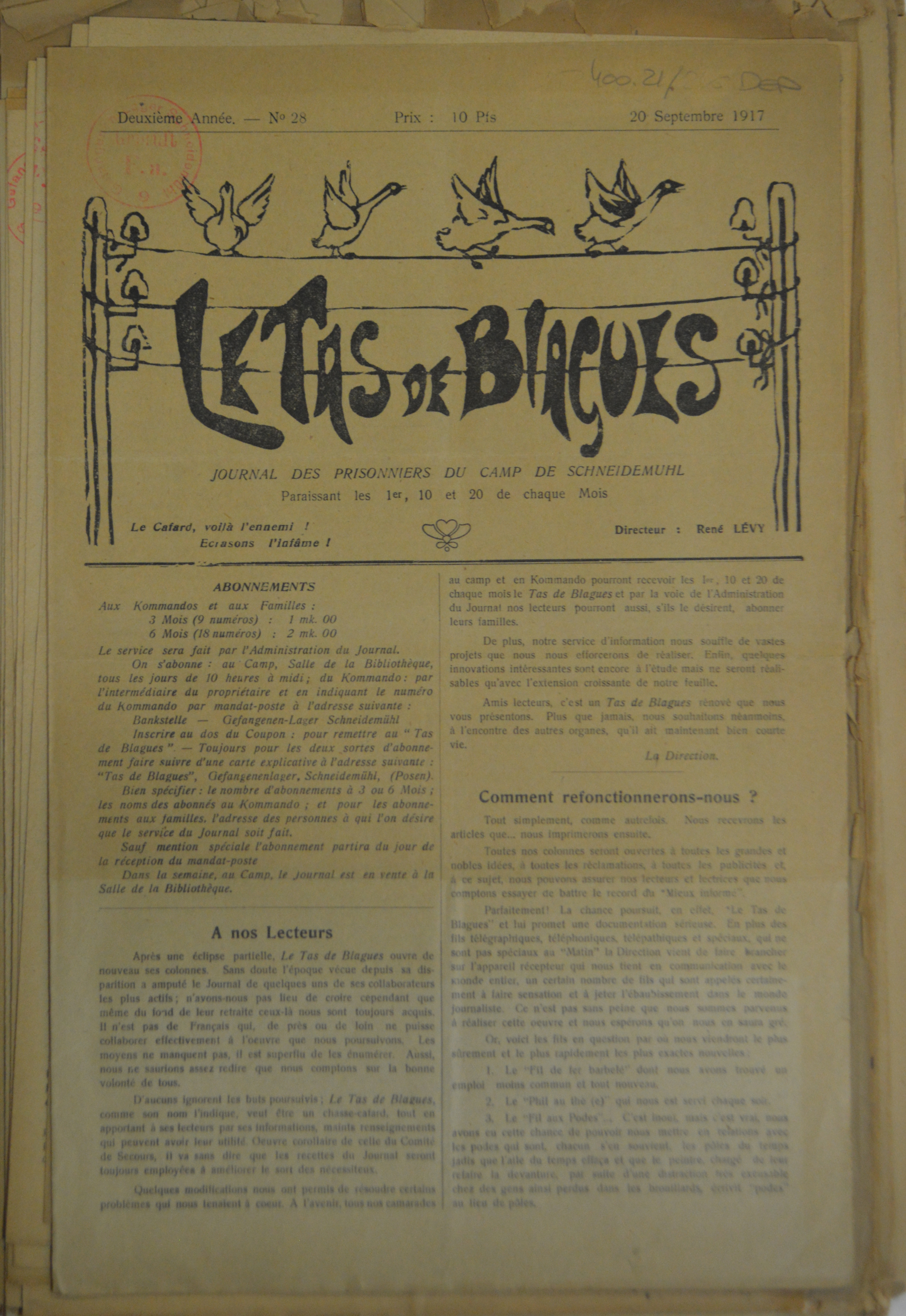

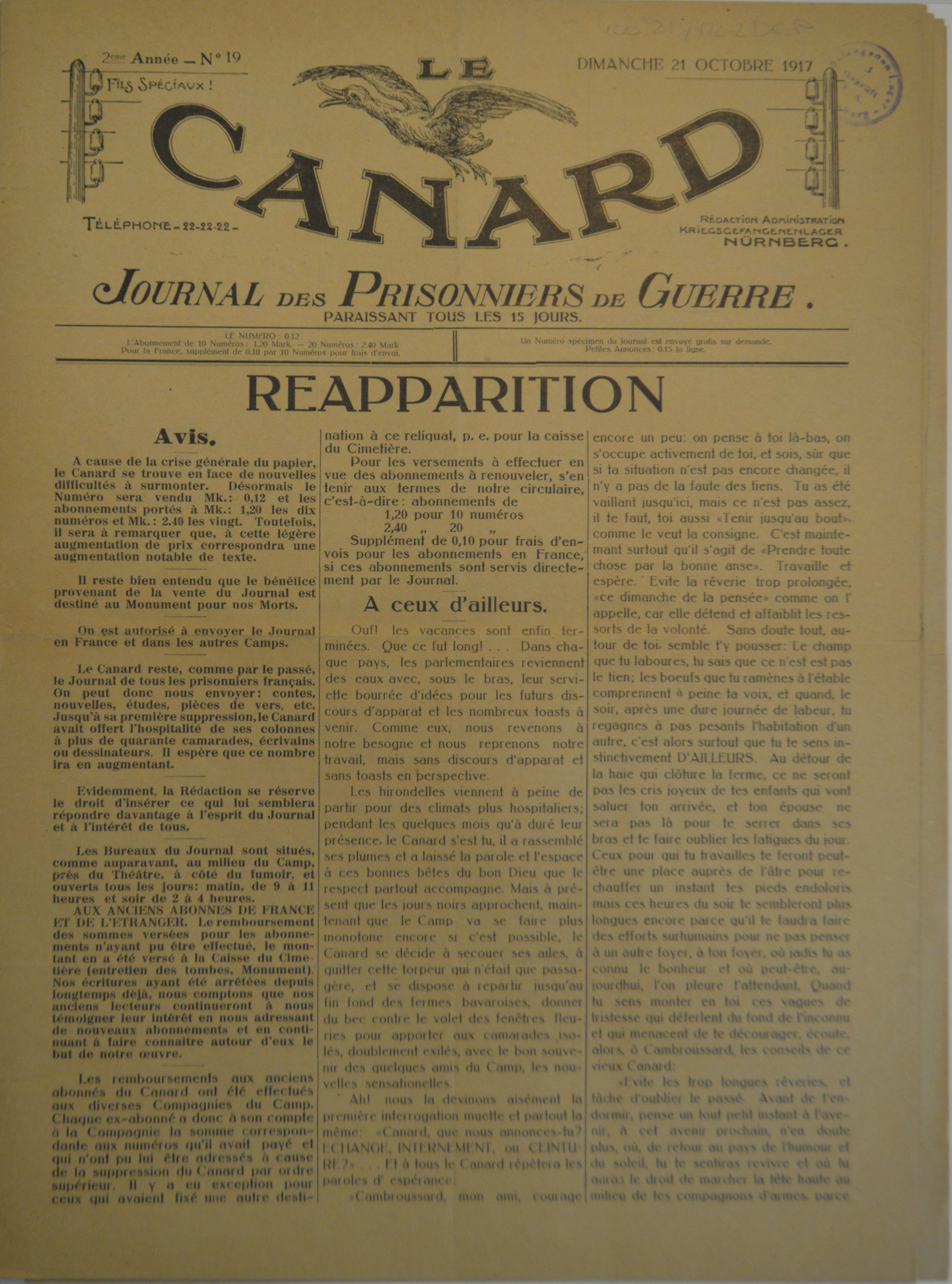

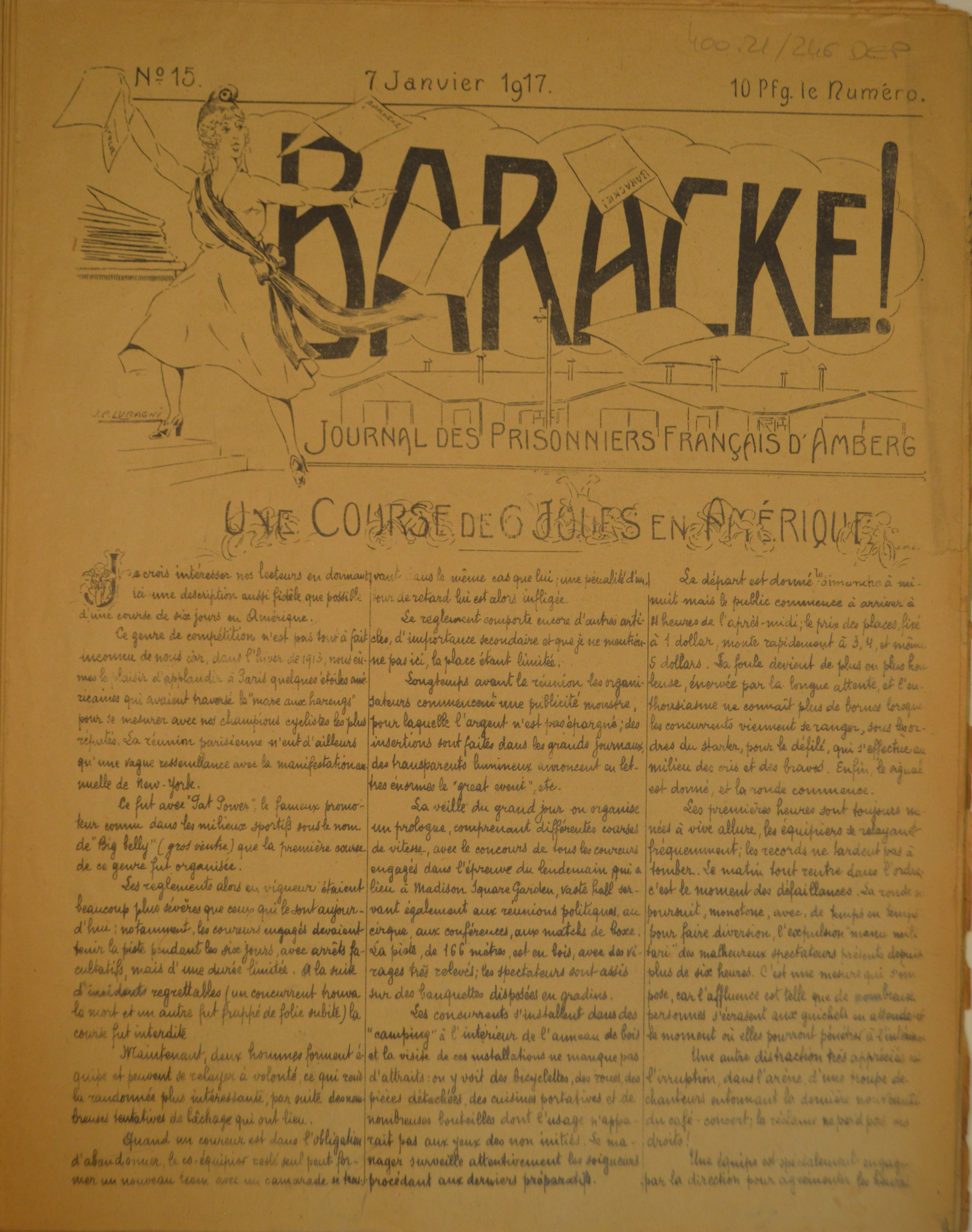

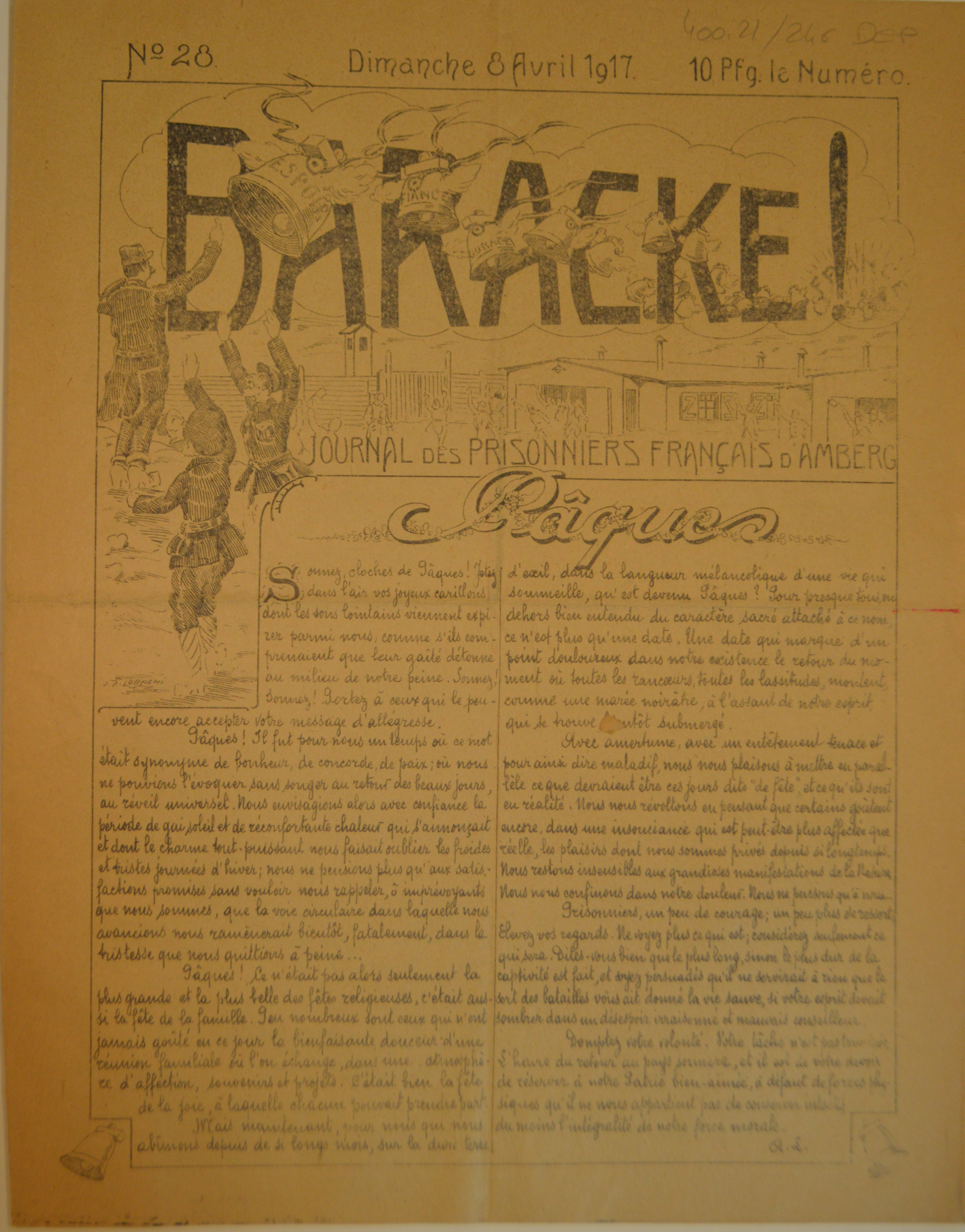

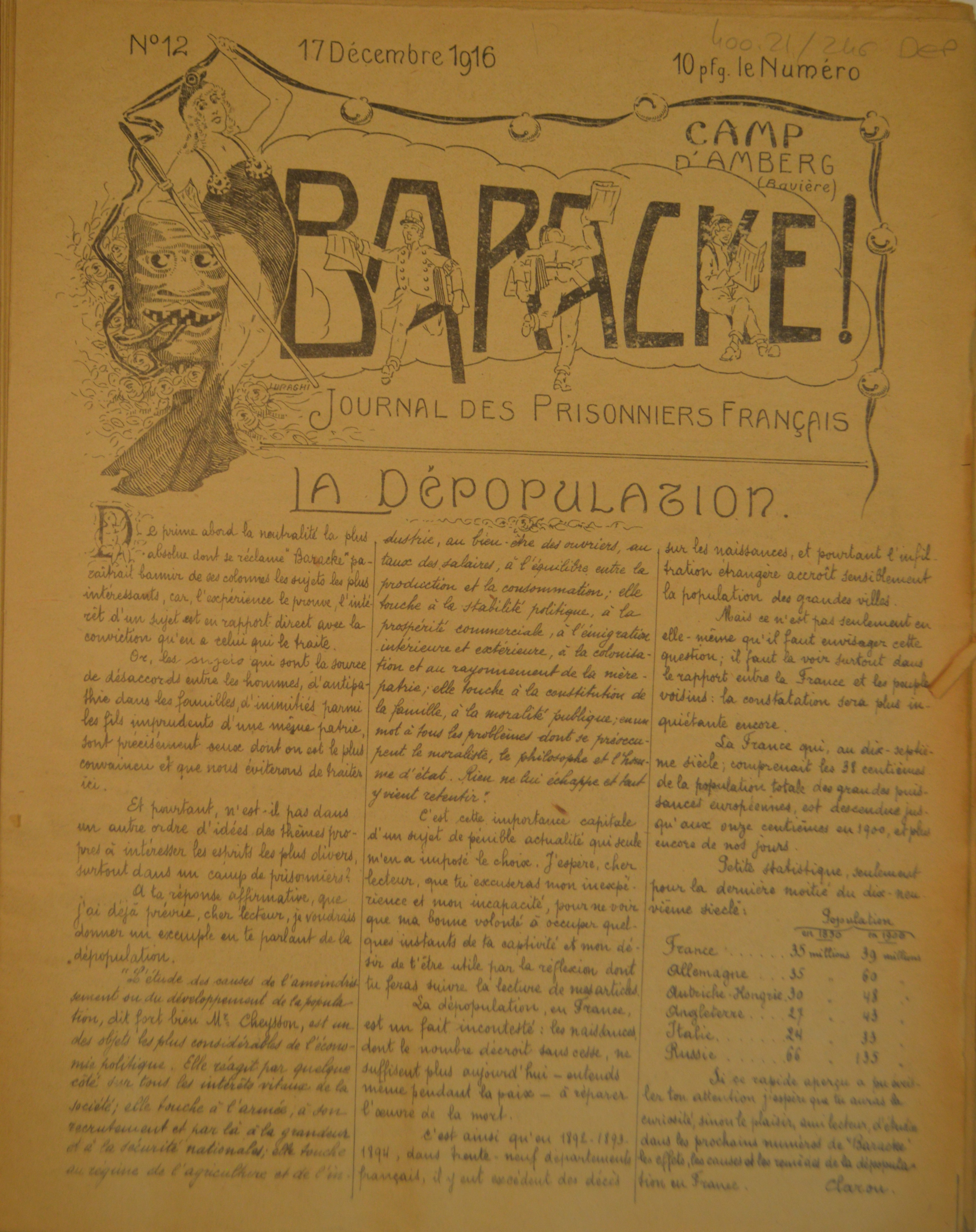

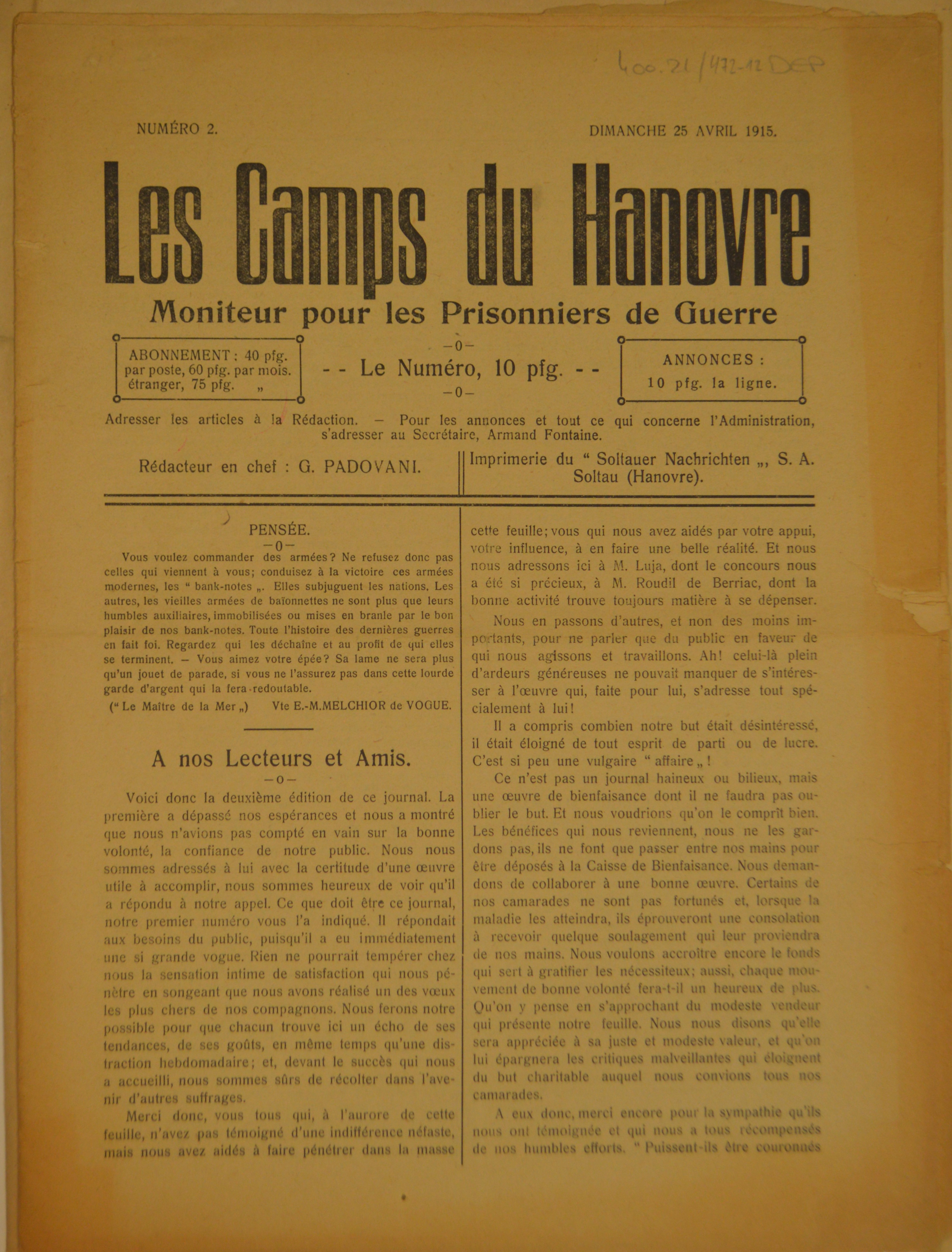

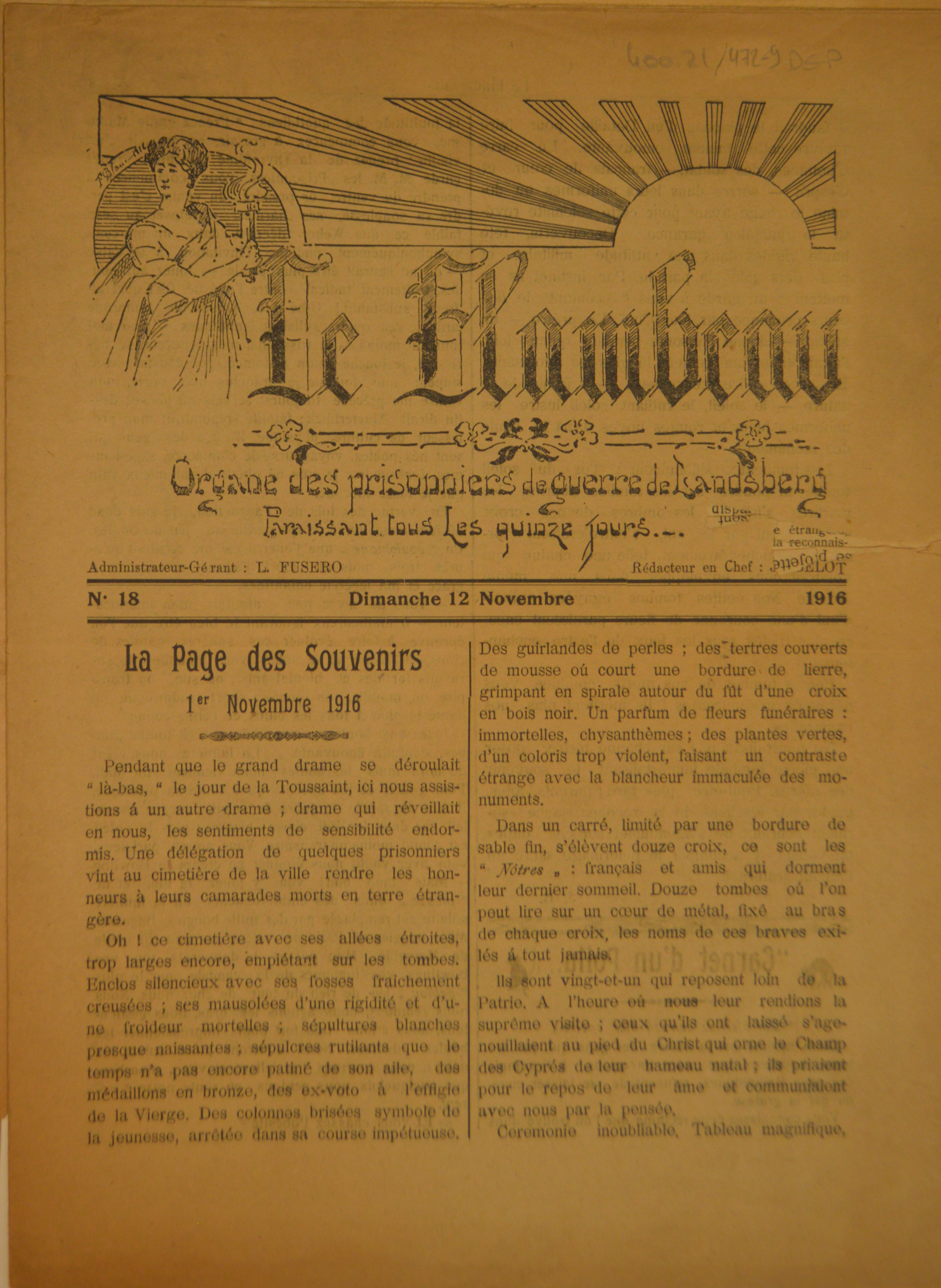

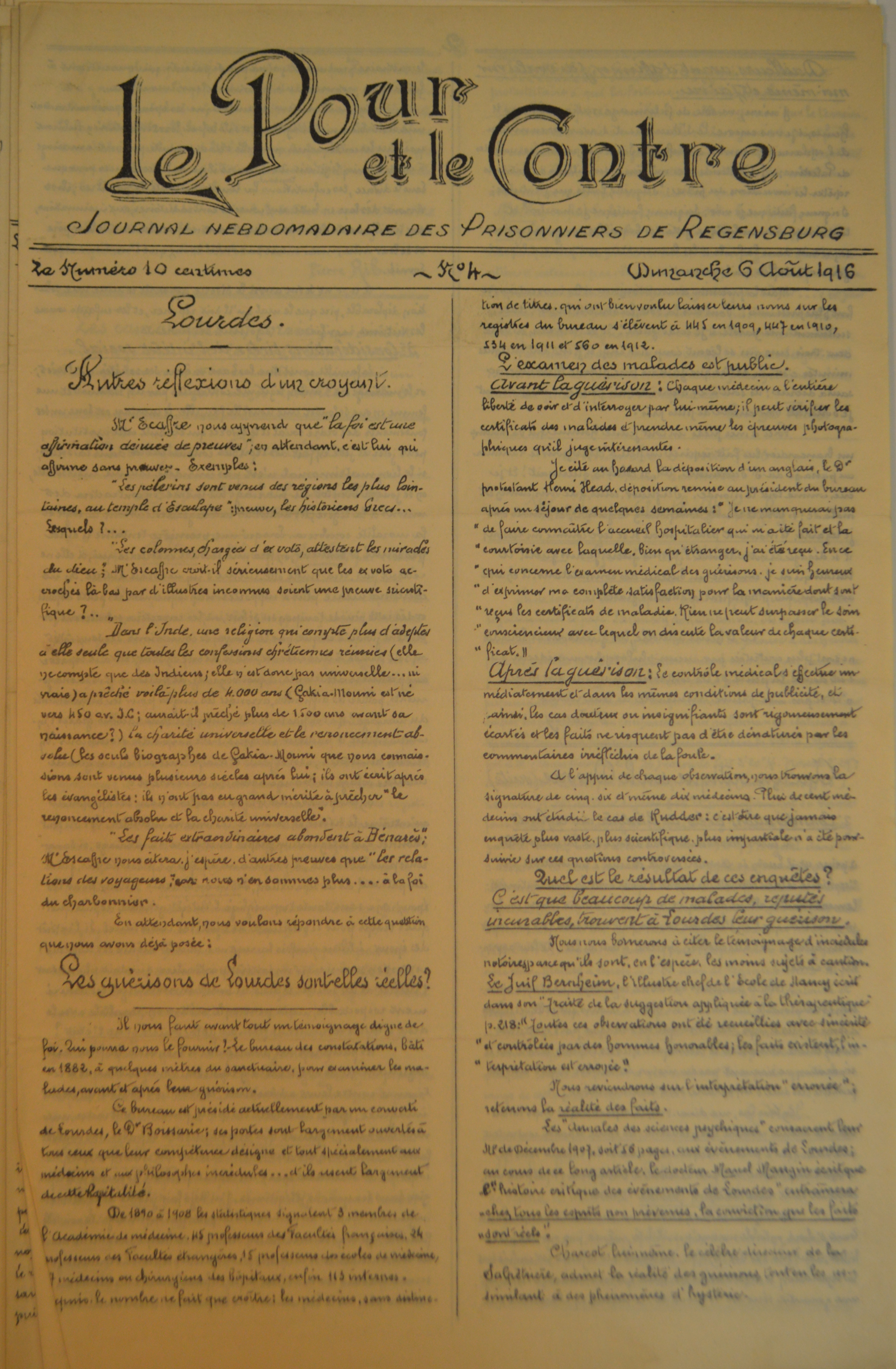

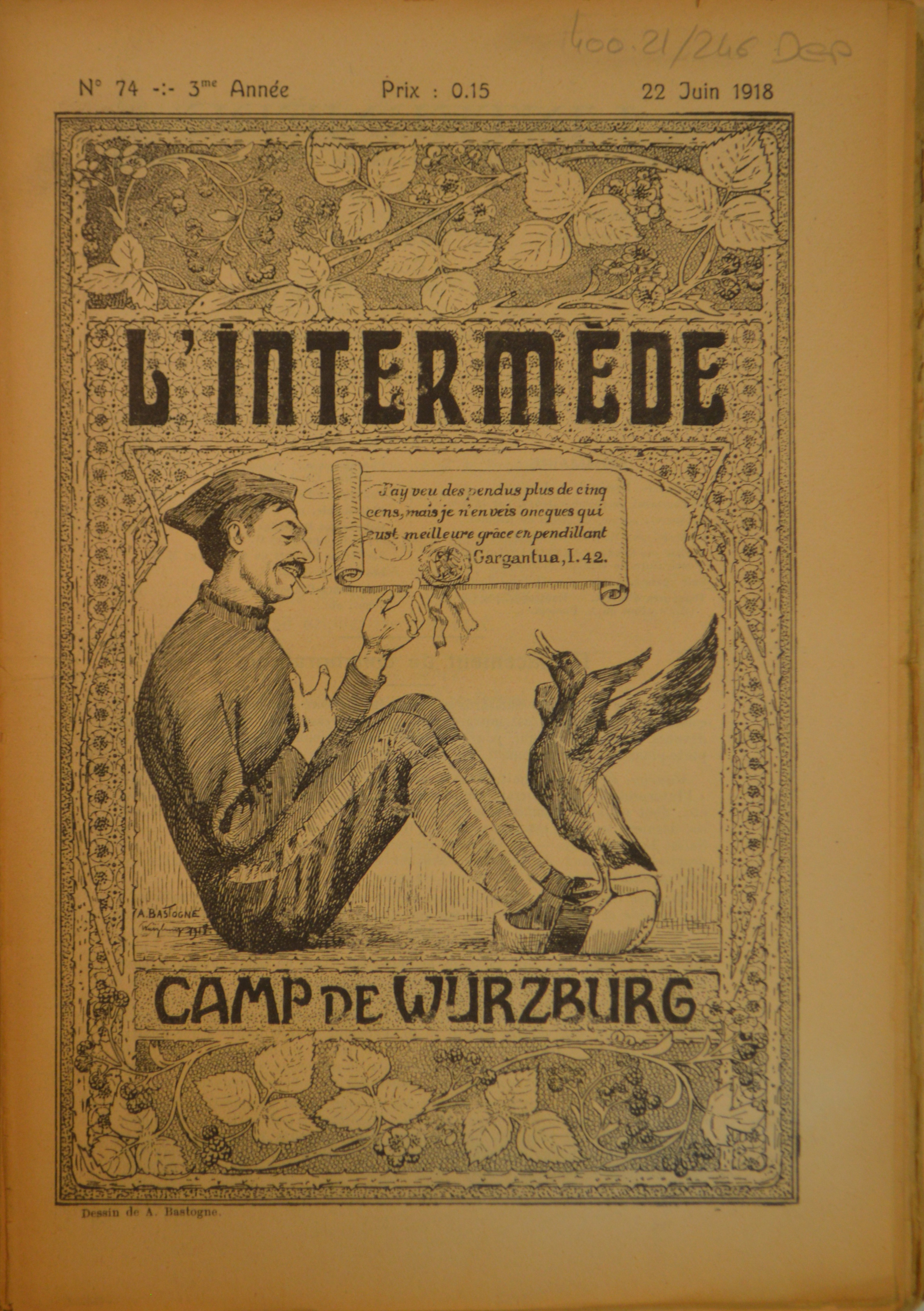

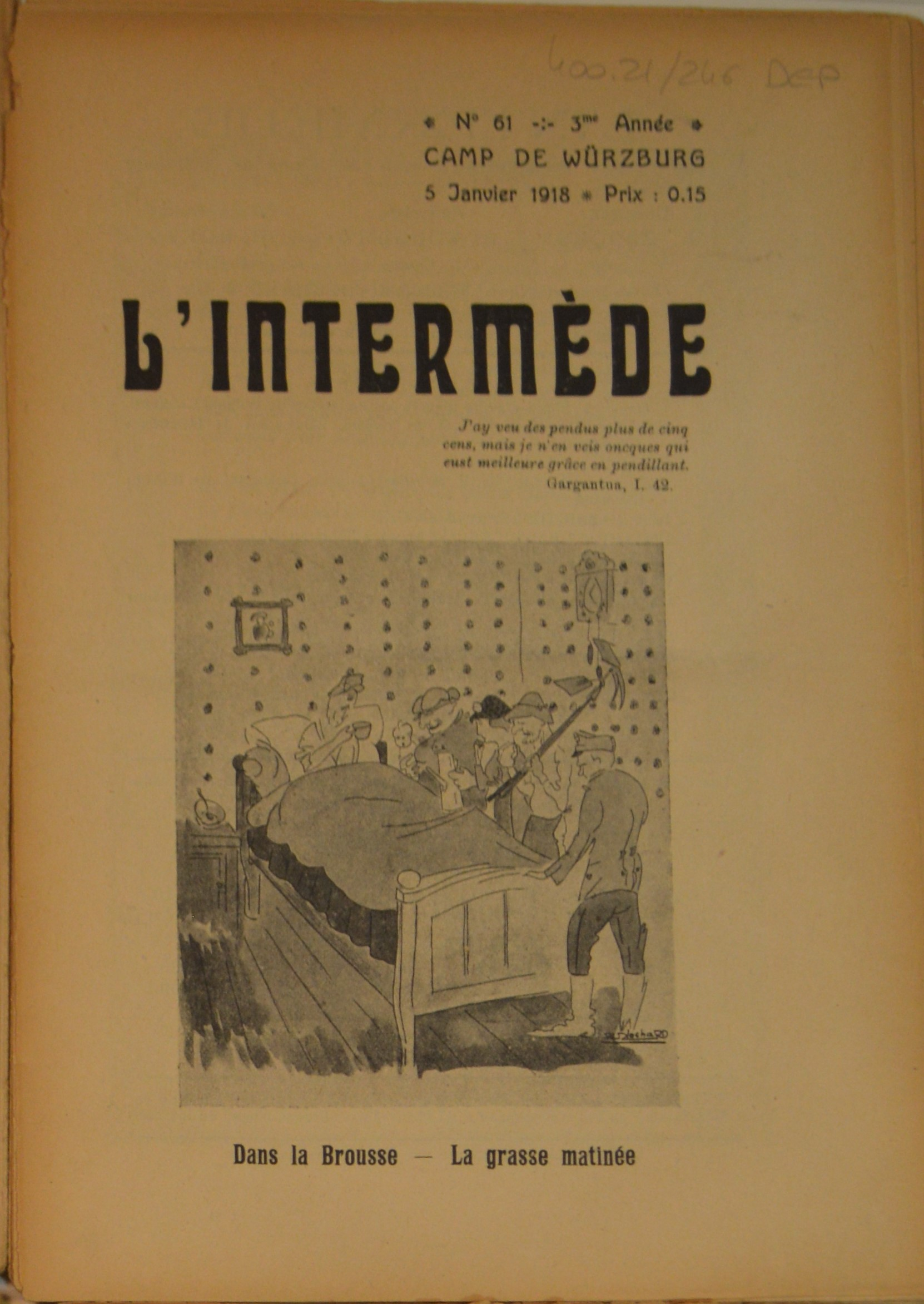

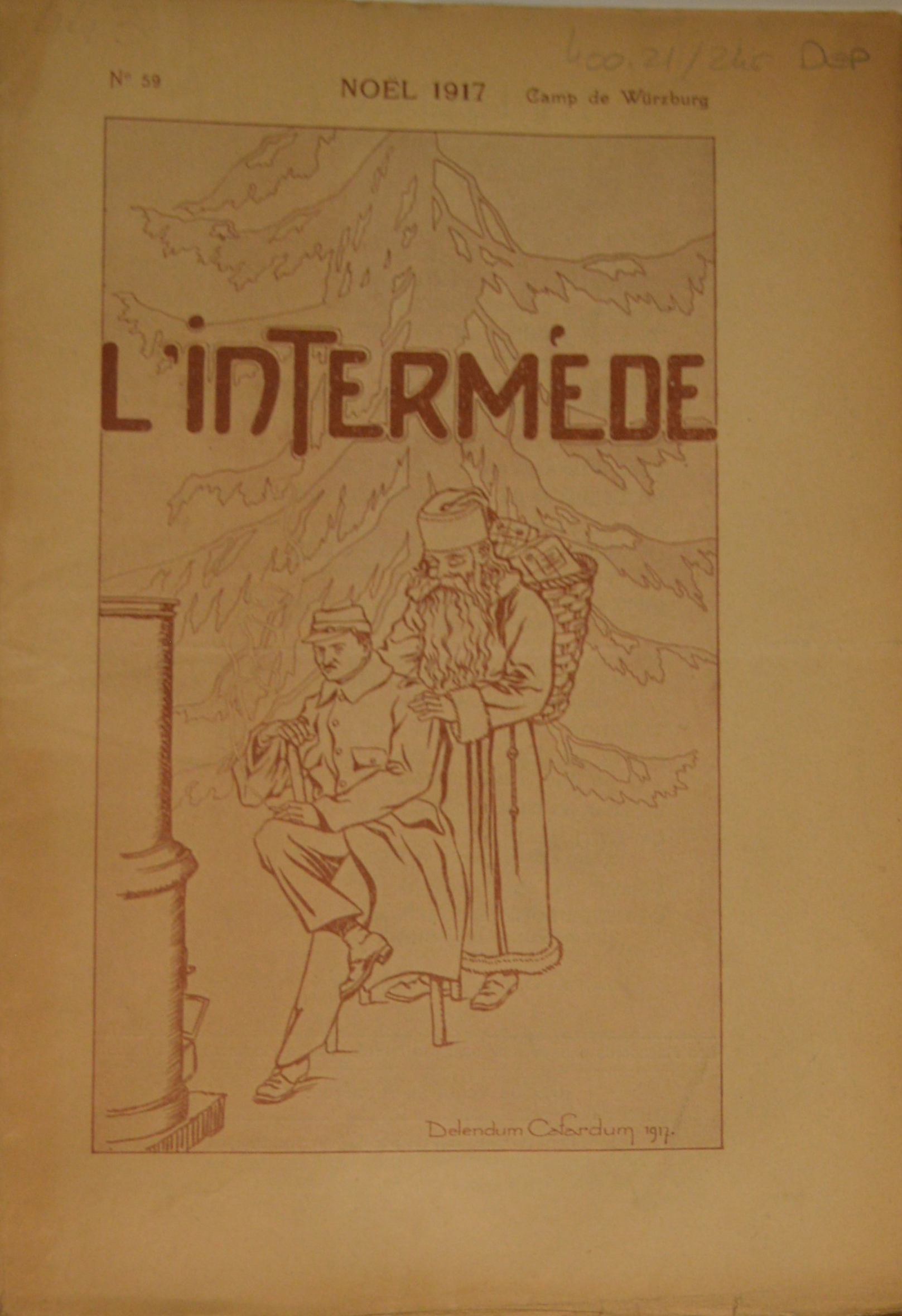

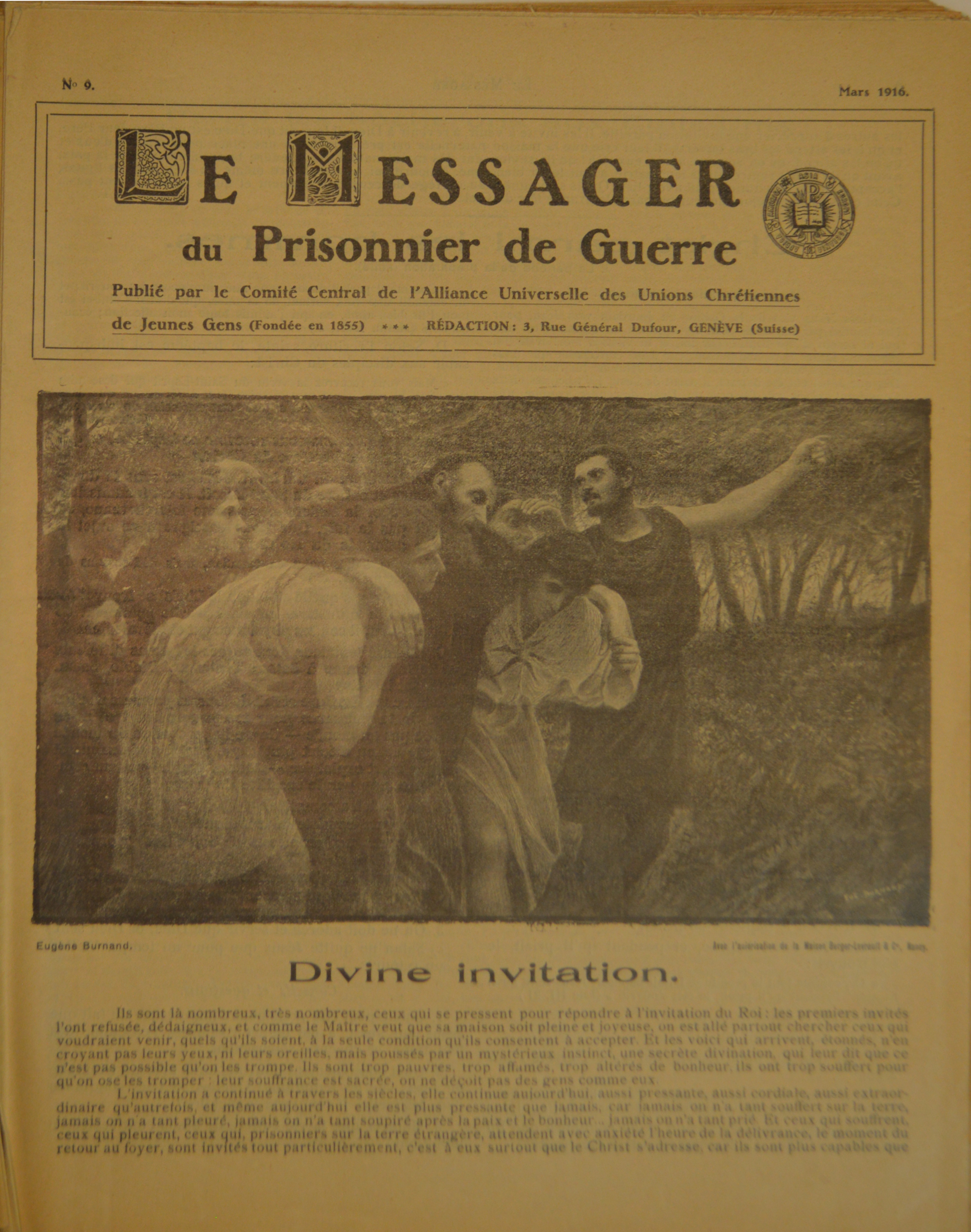

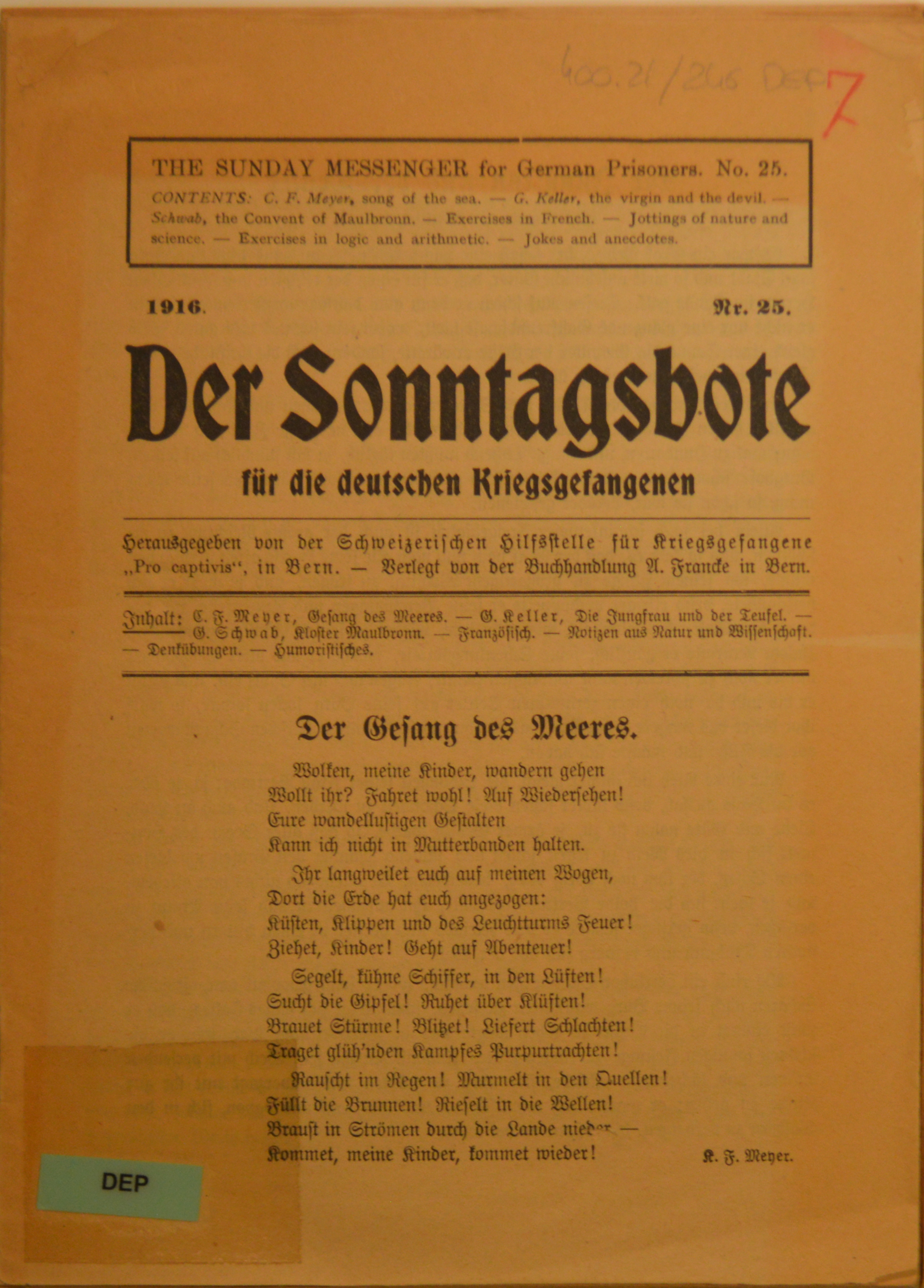

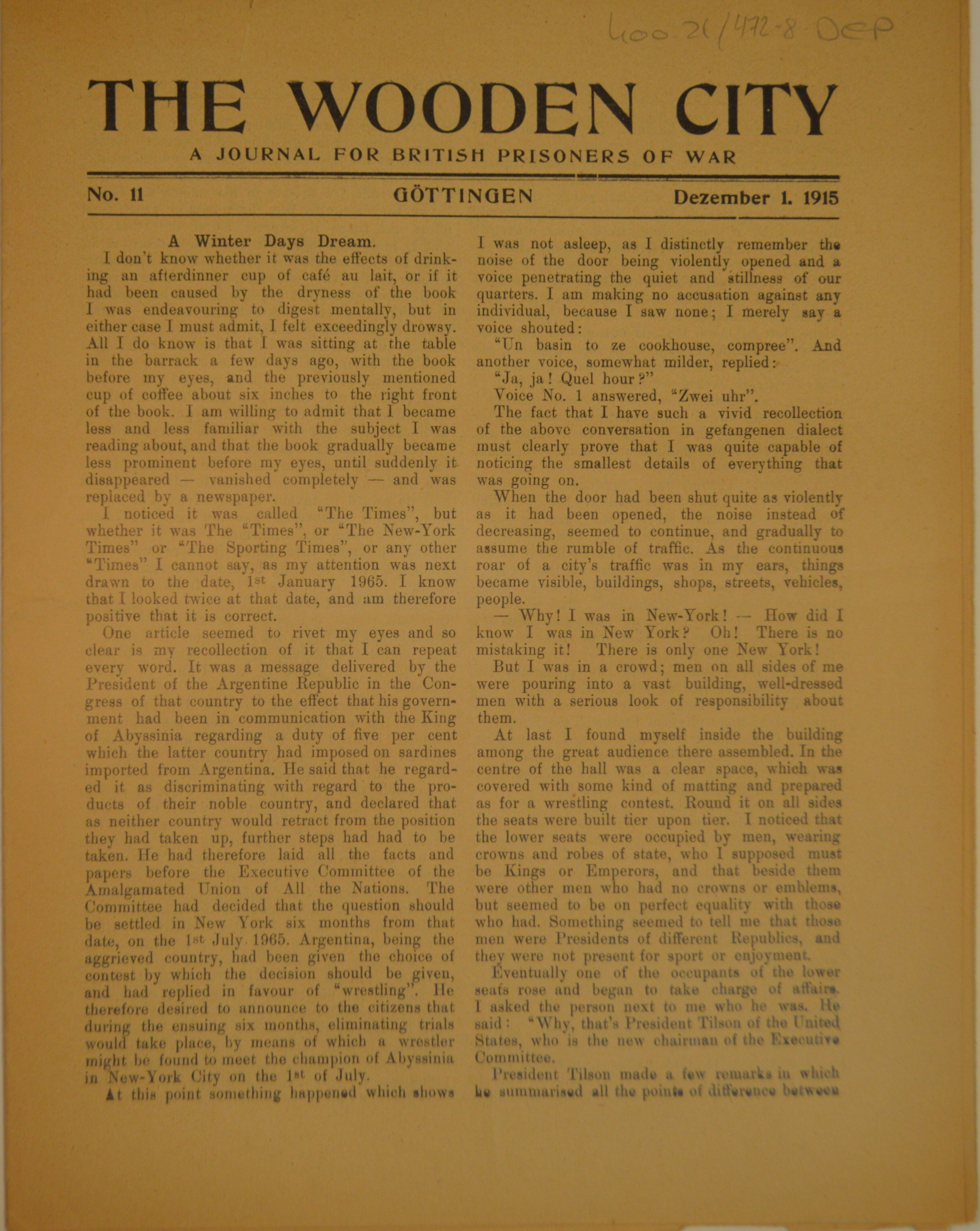

=== Stamps ===
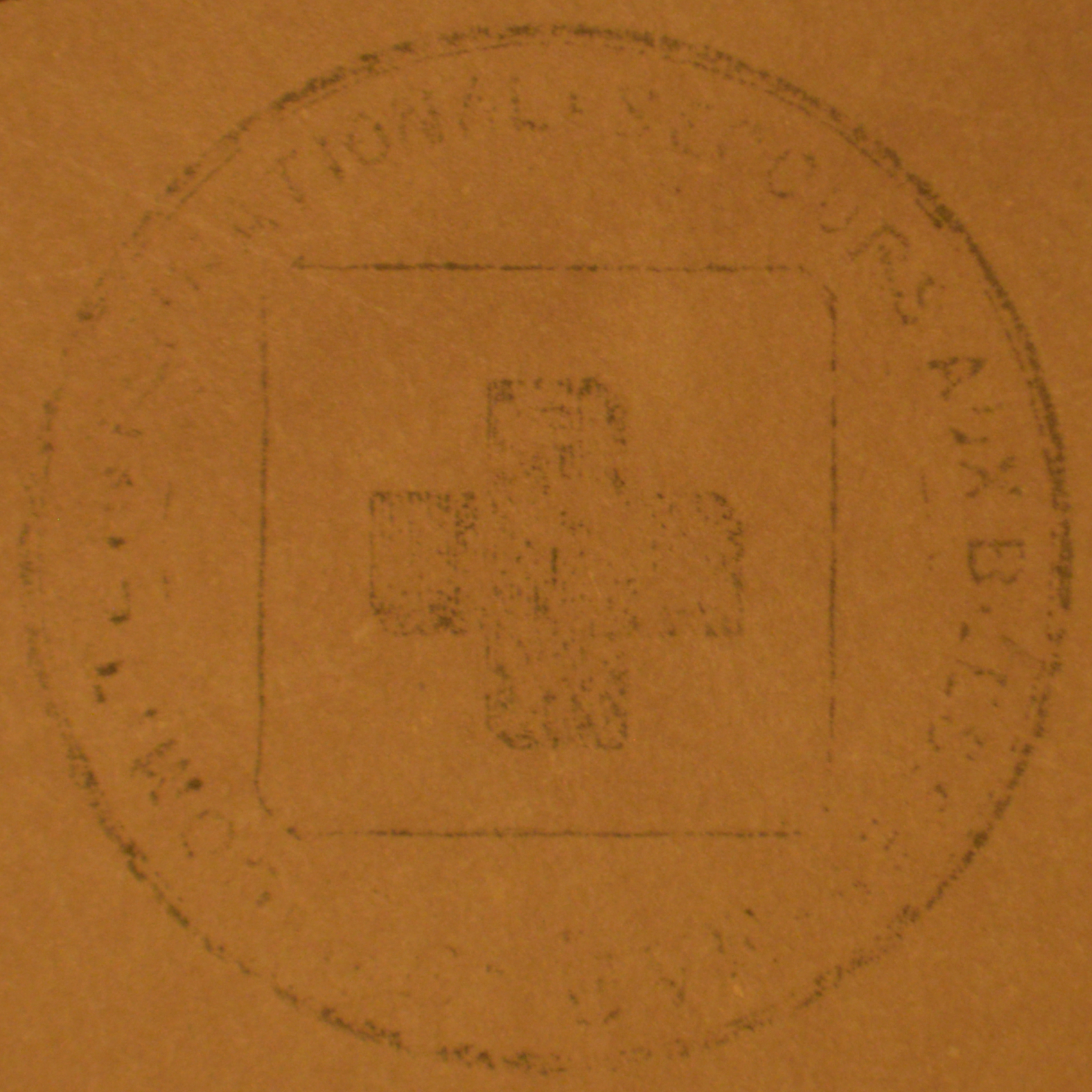

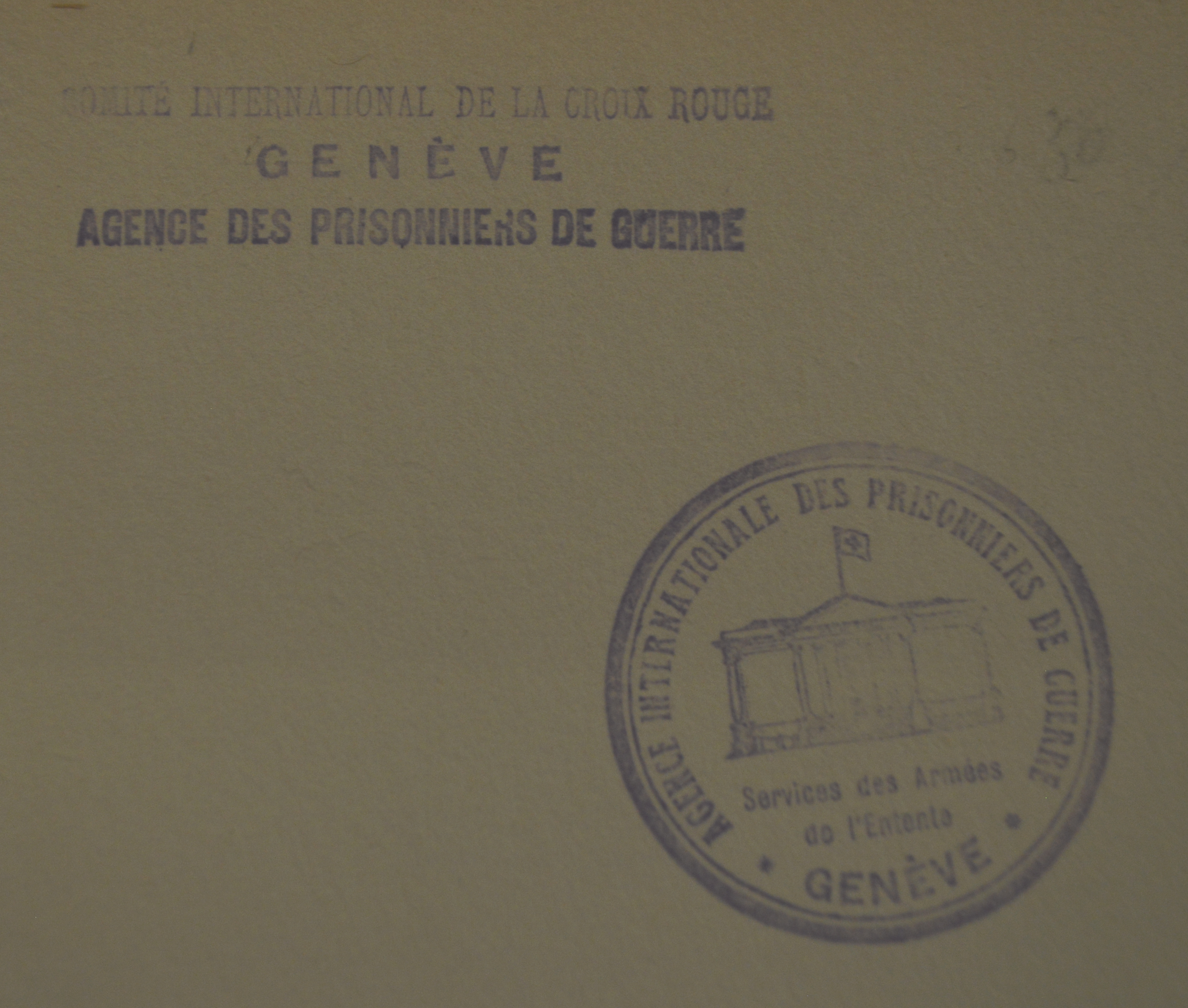

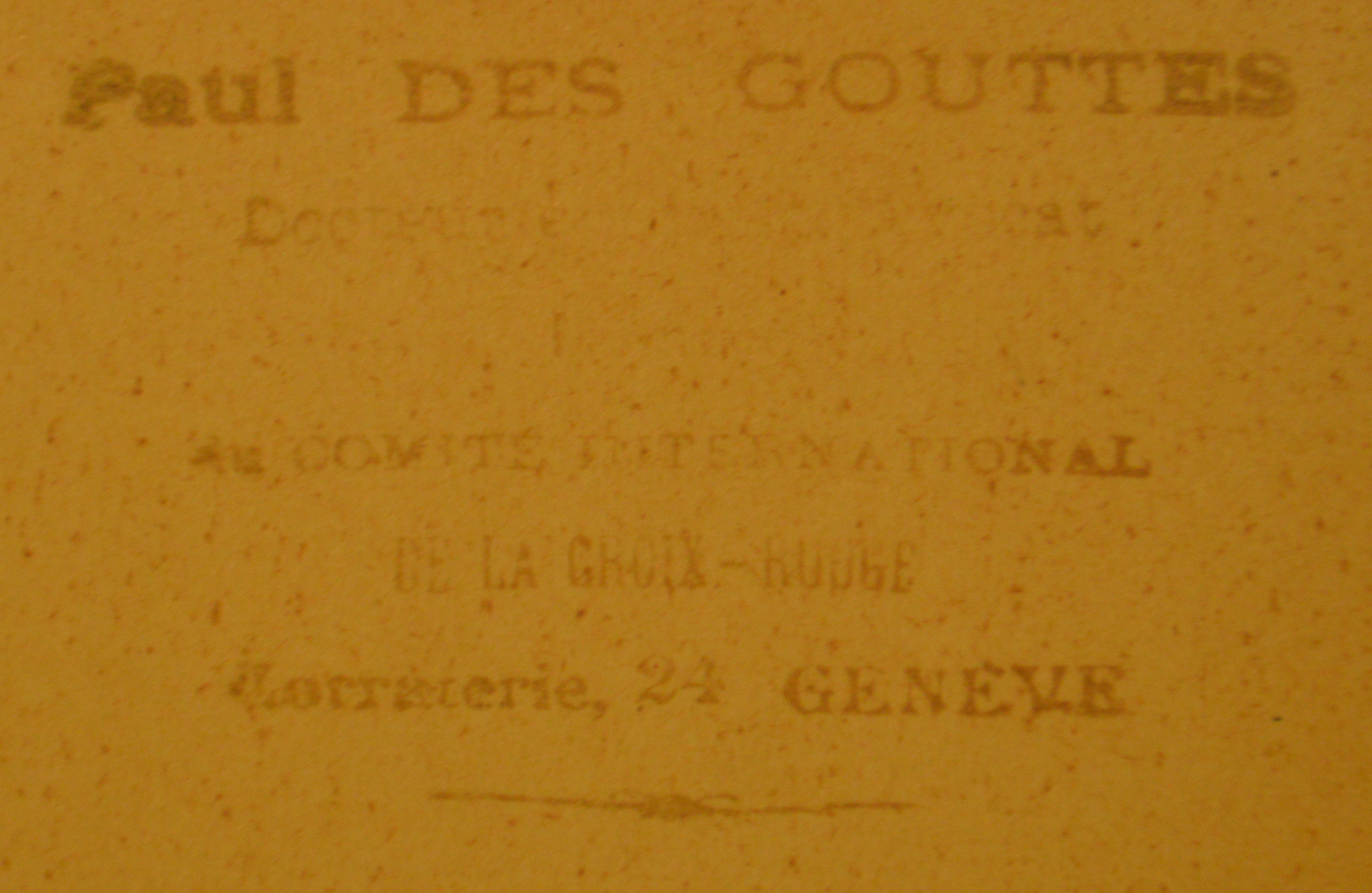

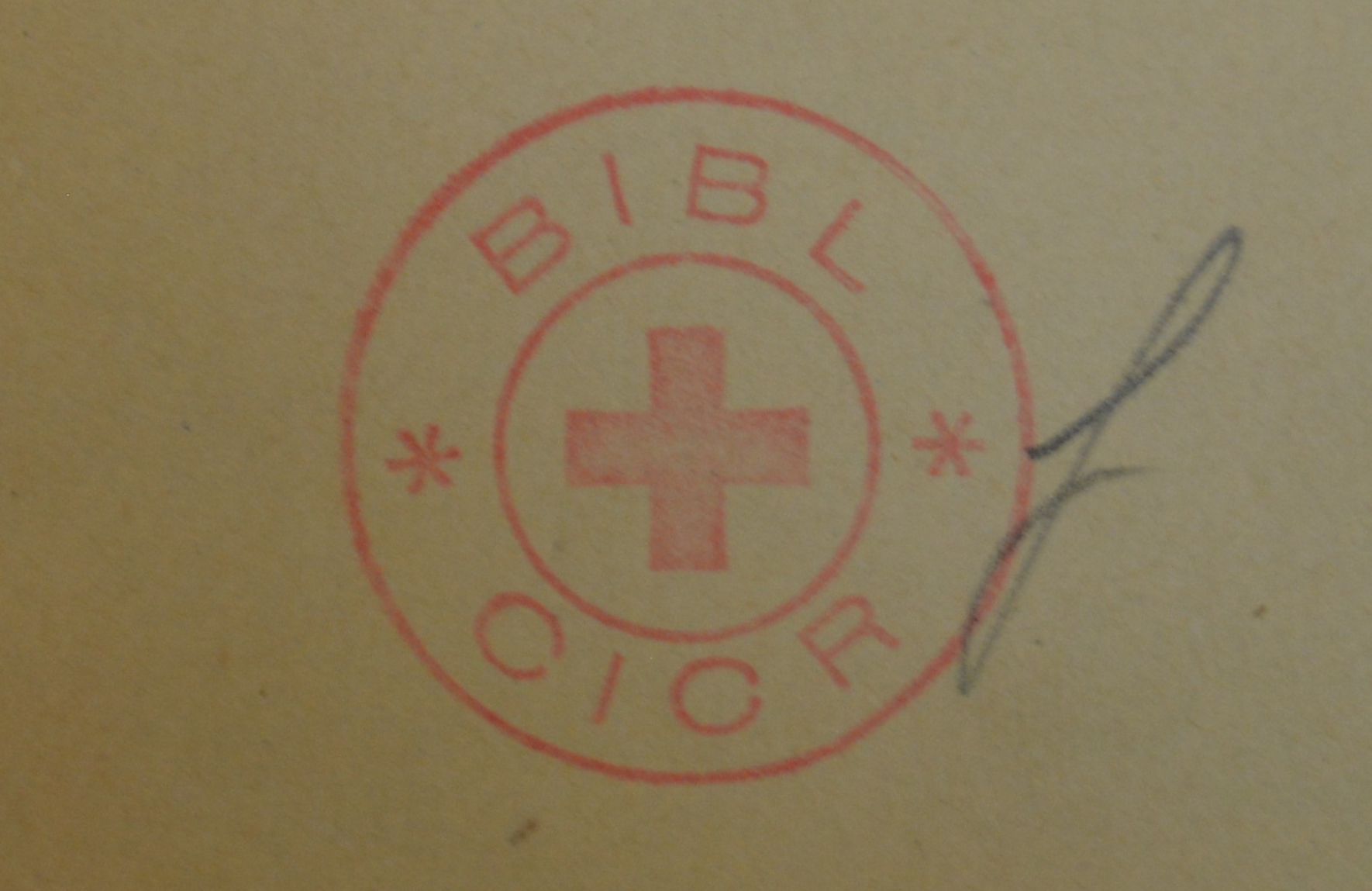

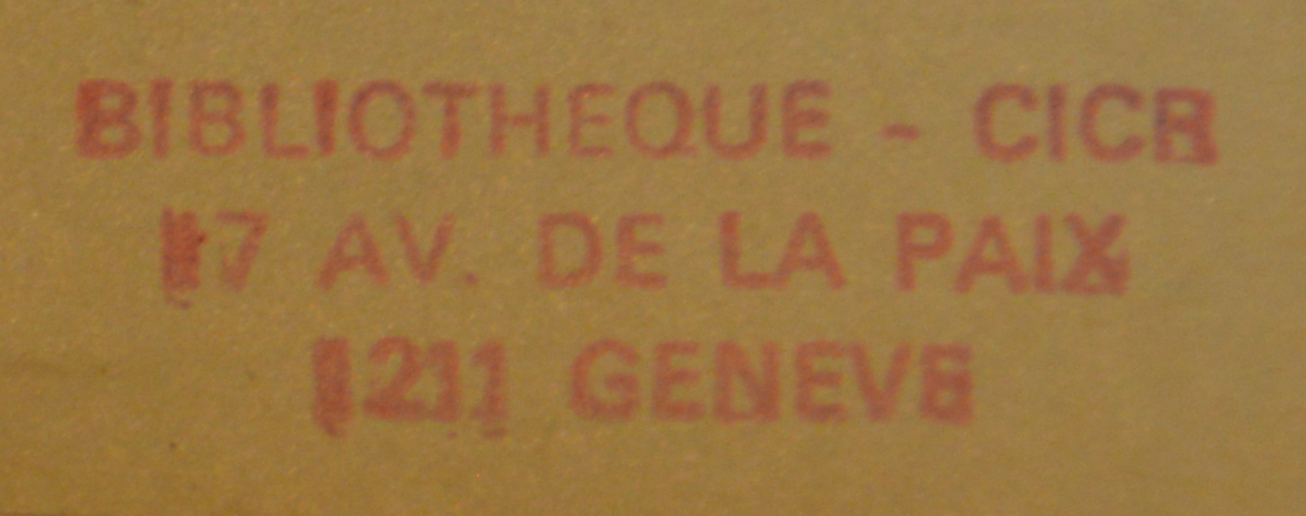

=== Autographs ===
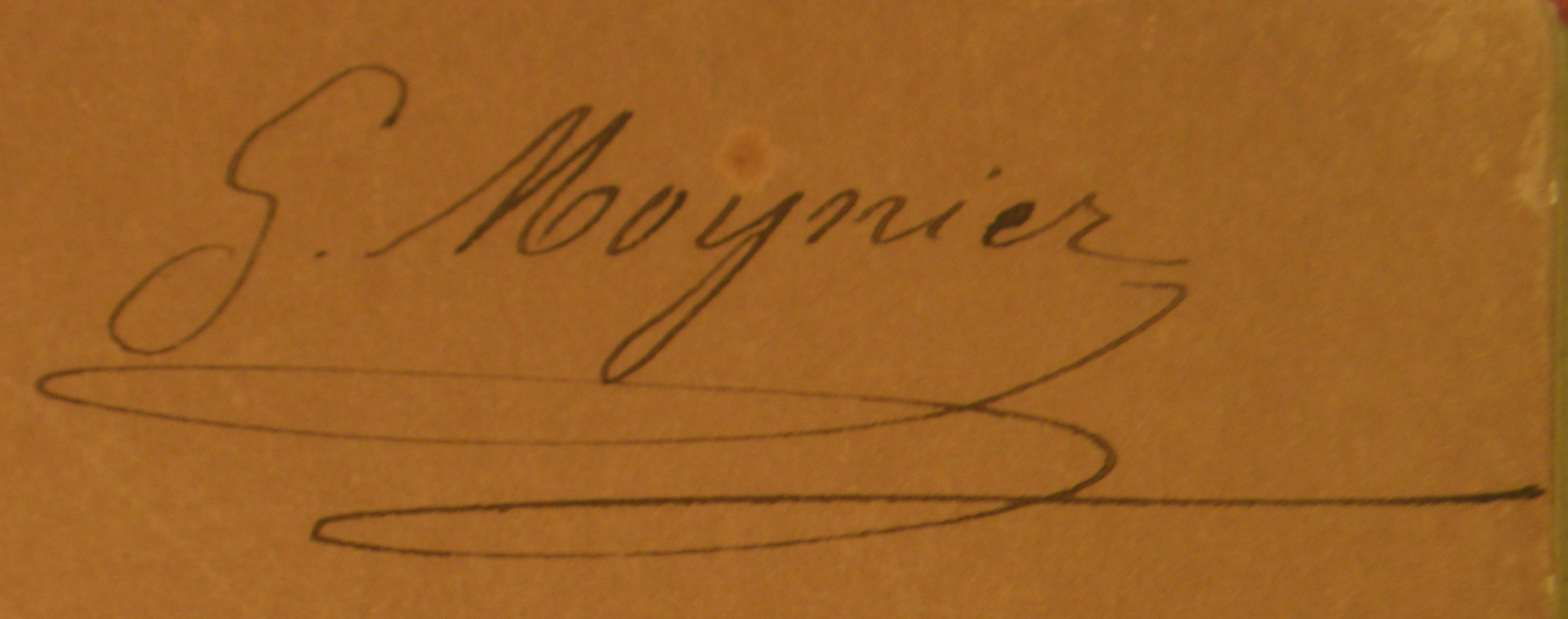
Gustave Moynier

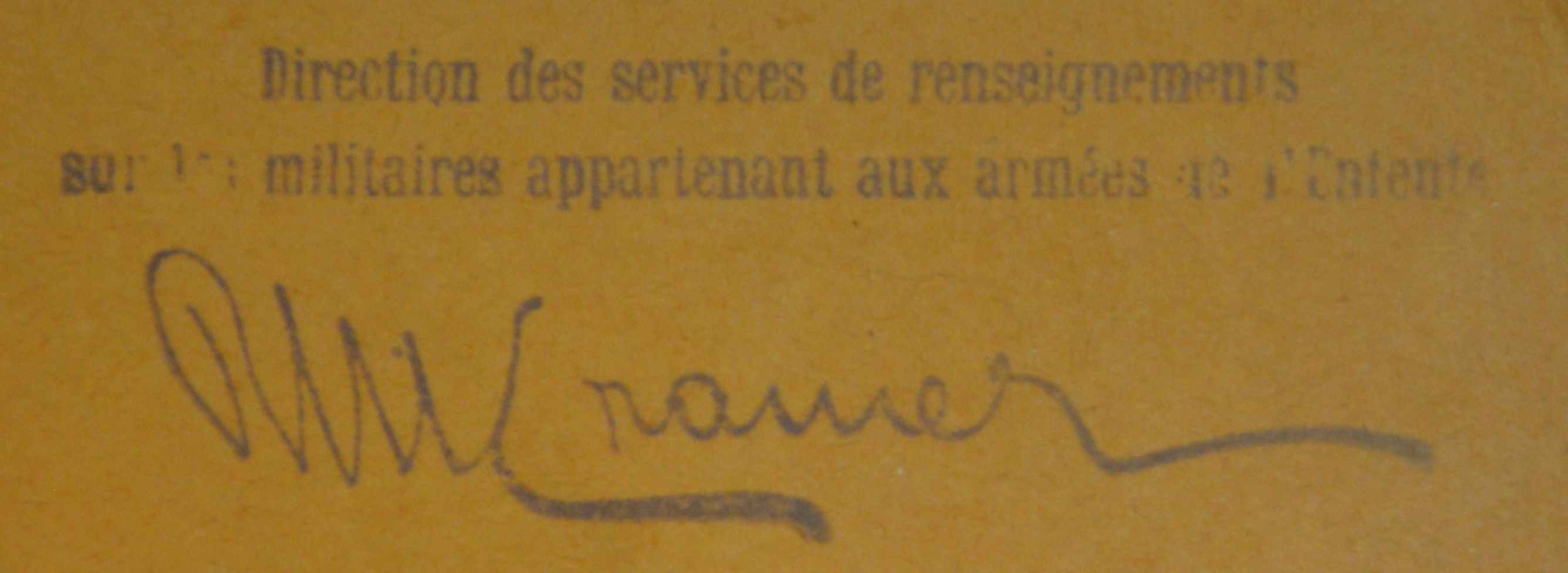
Renée-Marguerite Cramer, the first ever female Committee member

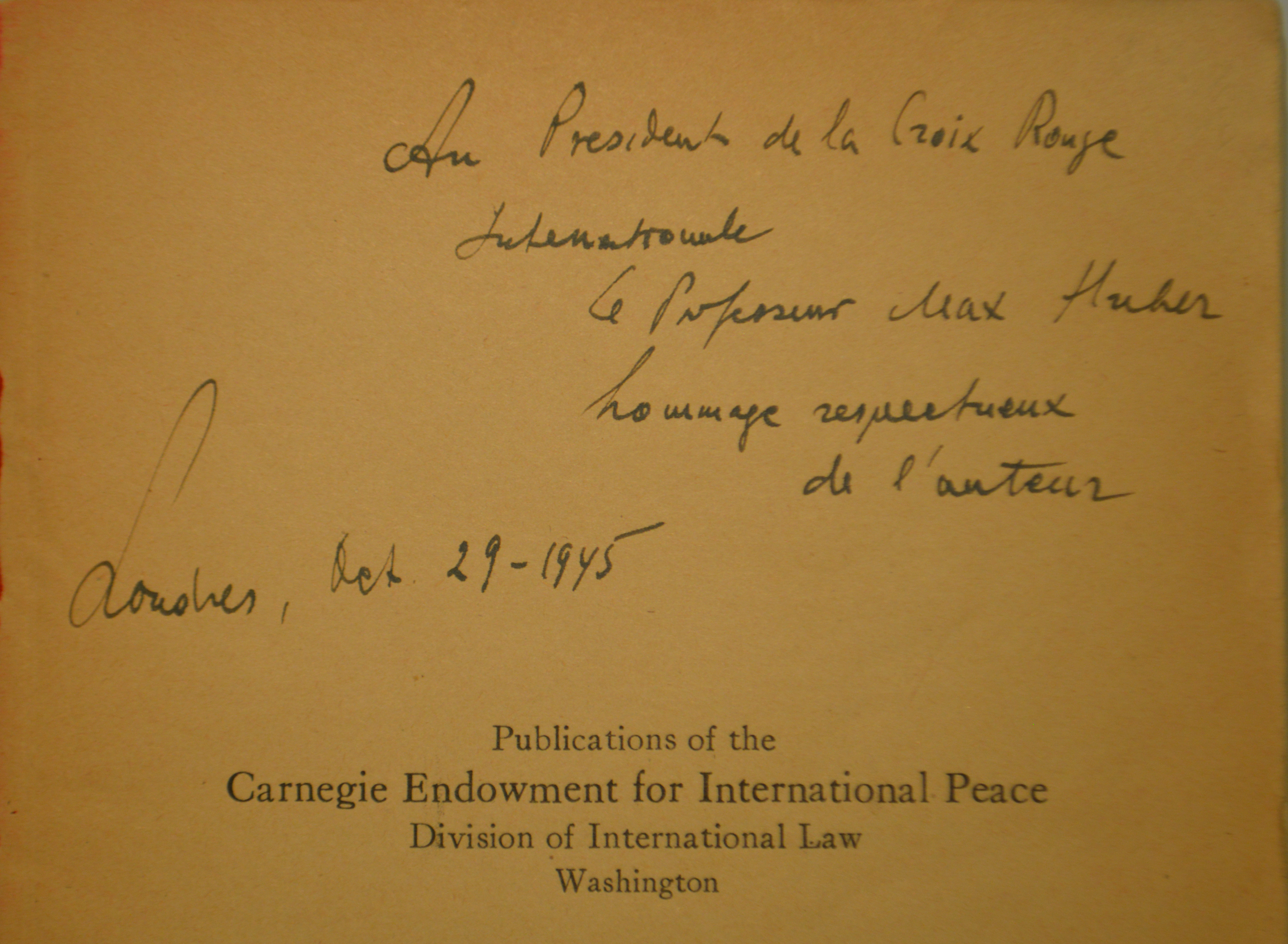
1945 dedication by Raphael Lemkin, who defined the term Genocide, to ICRC president Max Huber

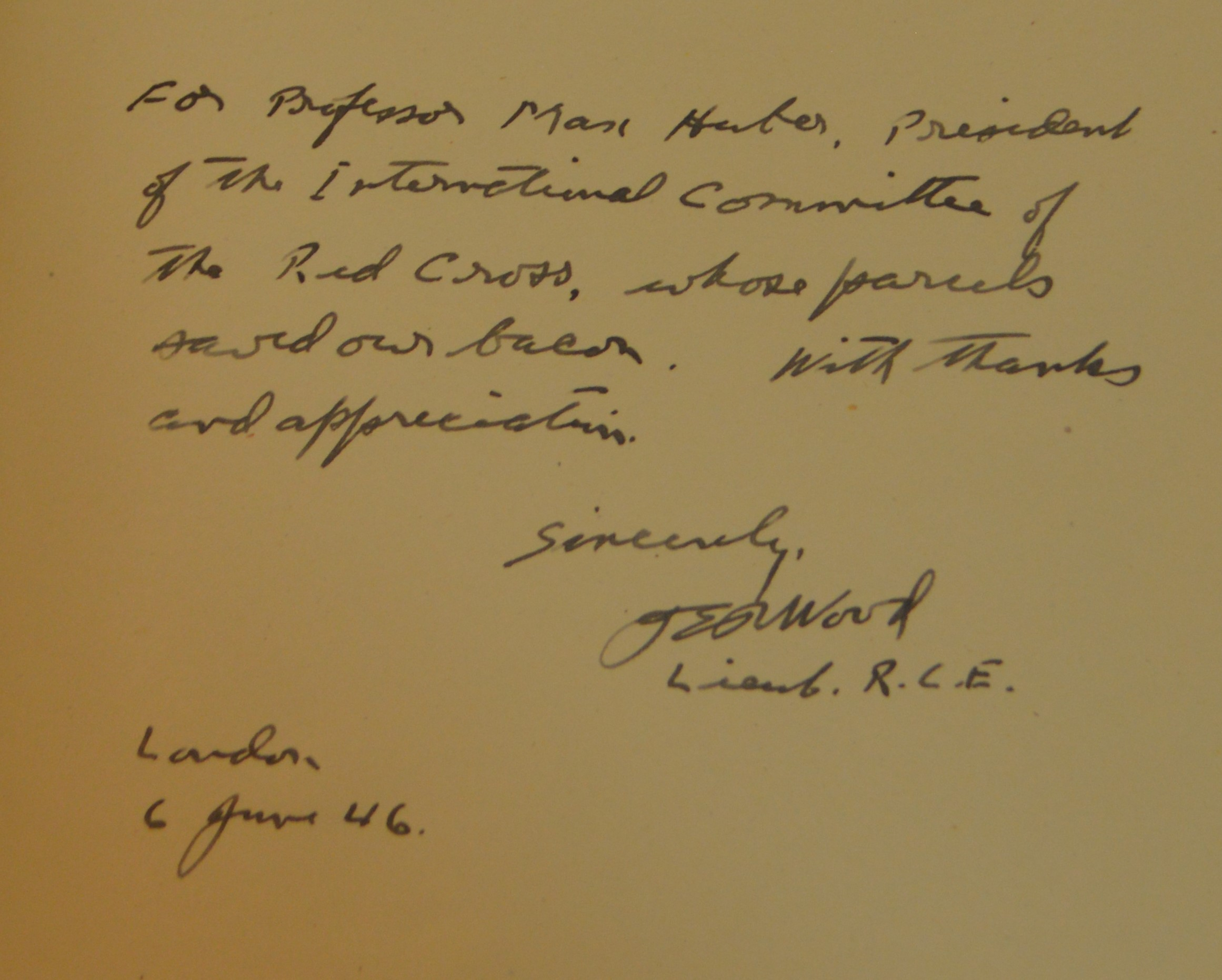
1946 dedication by JER Wood to Huber "whose parcels saved our bacon."

== See also ==
- List of libraries in Switzerland
