= A Memory of Solferino =

1862 book by Henry Dunant

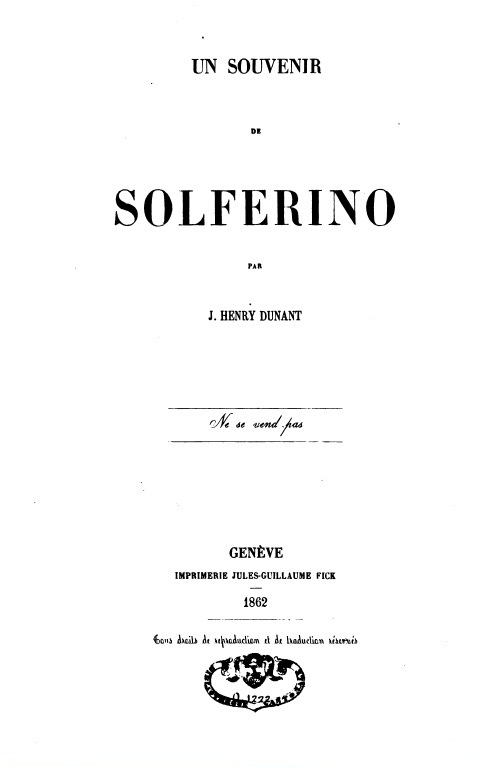
Cover of the original edition of A Memory of Solferino (1862)

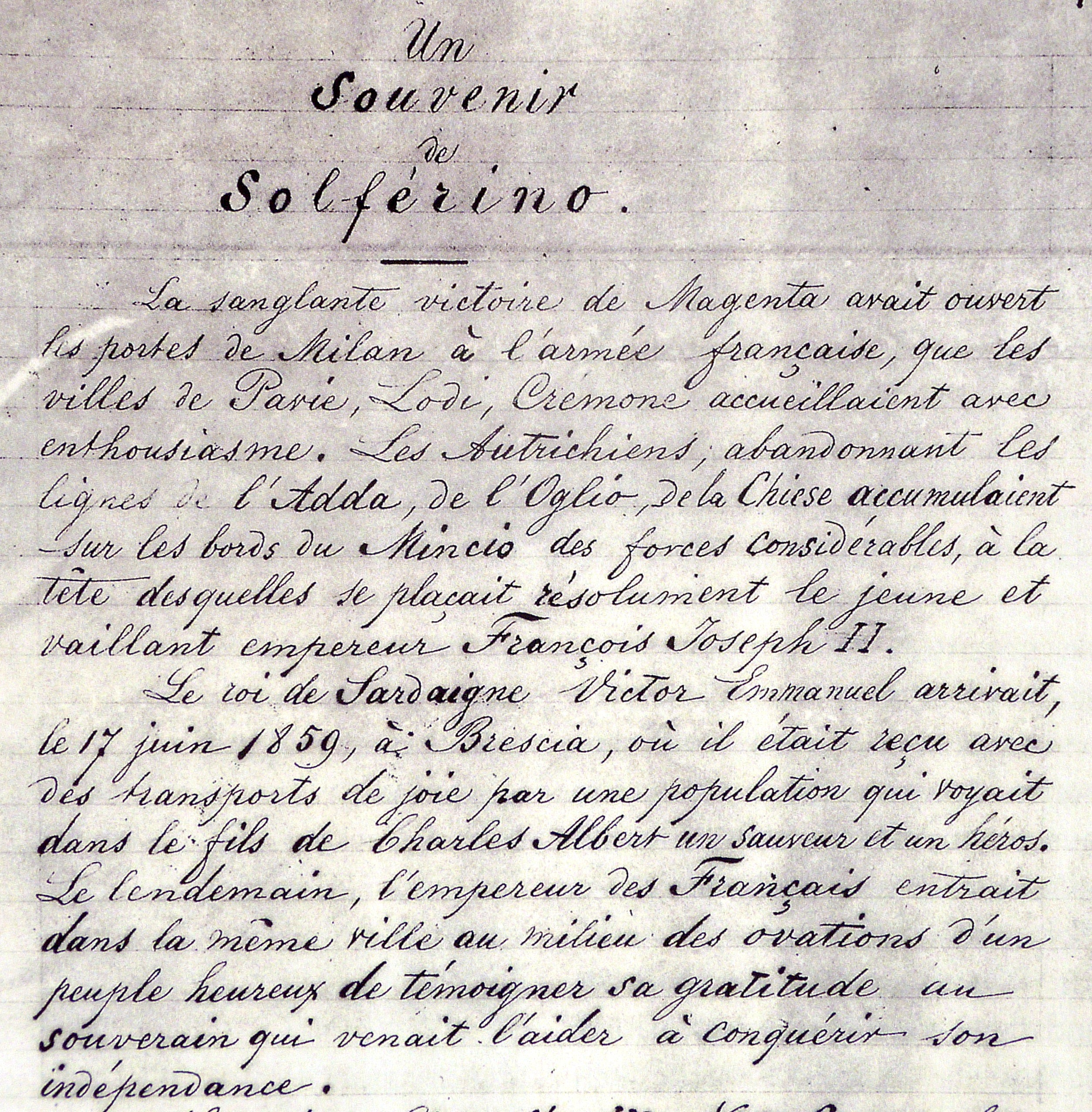
First page of the manuscript

A Memory of Solferino (French: Un souvenir de Solférino) is a book of the Swiss humanitarian Henry Dunant published in 1862. It proved decisive in the founding of the International Committee of the Red Cross.

== History ==
Witnessing the suffering of thousands of wounded soldiers of the Battle of Solferino in 1859 led the Swiss Dunant to write the book A Memory of Solferino. In the book, he describes the battle, the sufferings, the organisation of aid and asks:

- "Would it not be possible, in time of peace and quiet, to form relief societies for the purpose of having care given to the wounded in wartime by zealous, devoted and thoroughly qualified volunteers?"
- "On certain special occasions, as, for example, when princes of the military art belonging to different nationalities meet at Cologne or Châlons, would it not be desirable that they should take advantage of this sort of congress to formulate some international principle, sanctioned by a Convention inviolate in character, which, once agreed upon and ratified, might constitute the basis for societies for the relief of the wounded in the different European countries ?"

The publication of the book led to the establishment of the International Committee of the Red Cross (International Red Cross and Red Crescent Movement) and the Geneva Conventions.

== See also ==
- Louis Appia
- Guillaume-Henri Dufour
- Théodore Maunoir
- Gustave Moynier
