= Gustave Moynier =

Swiss jurist

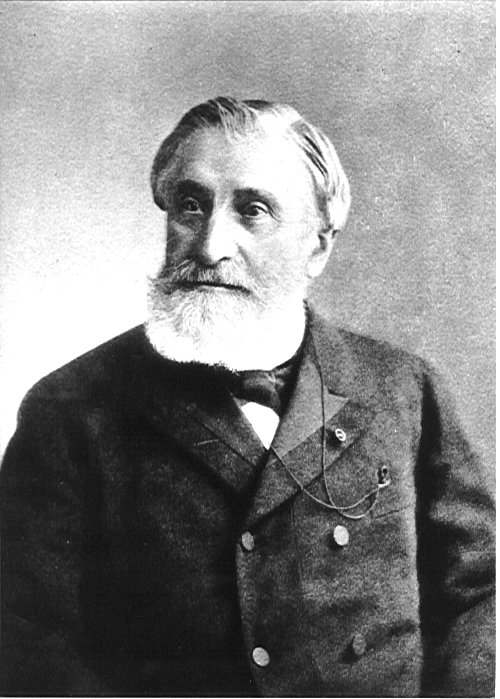
- Gustave Moynier
- Born: September 21, 1826; Geneva, Switzerland
- Died: August 21, 1910 (aged 83); Sécheron, Geneva, Switzerland
- Resting place: Cimetière des Rois , Geneva
- Citizenship: Swiss
- Education: University of Paris; University of Geneva
- Occupation: Jurist
- Years active: 1864–1910
- Known for: Co-founder and longest-serving President of the International Committee of the Red Cross (ICRC)
- Spouse: Jeanne-Françoise Paccard
- Children: Adolphe Moynier
- Parent(s): Jacques-André Moynier (father); Laure Deonna (mother)

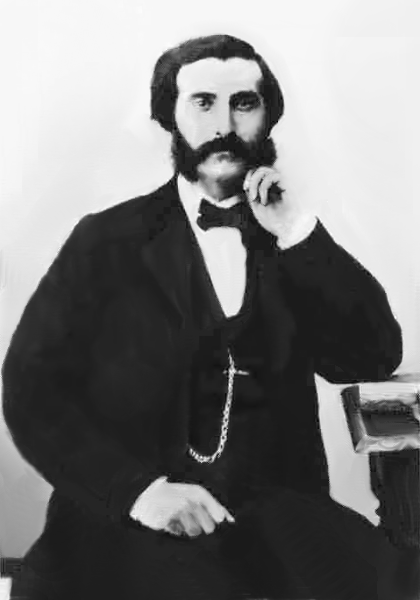
Moynier in his youth

Gustave Moynier (21 September 1826 – 21 August 1910) was a Swiss jurist who was active in many charitable organizations in Geneva.

He was a co-founder of the International Committee for Relief to the Wounded, which became the International Committee of the Red Cross after 1876. In 1864, he took over the position of president of the committee from Guillaume-Henri Dufour, and he was also a major rival of the founder Henry Dunant. During his record long term of 46 years as president, he did much to support the development of the committee in the first decades after its creation.

== Background ==
Moynier, born in Geneva, belonged to a noble Huguenot family originally from Le Cailar, in the Gard department of France. The family was forced to flee to Switzerland due to religious persecution for their Protestant faith. Both his grandfather and father were master watchmakers. His father, André Moynier, decided to enter politics in 1842 and became a Council of State member in 1843. The Moynier family lived through the 1846 revolution led by James Fazy, which was around the time Gustave met his wife. When he finished secondary school in 1842, he attended preparatory courses for four years. In 1846, he obtained his baccalaureate degree. Then, because of the revolution, he returned to France and continued his studies at the Sorbonne. There he discovered a strong interest in law. On 1 March 1850, he defended his thesis accompanied by Pastor Joseph Martin-Paschoud of the Protestant Oratory of the Louvre. His thesis was a success, and he began his legal training. He successfully passed his bar exam on 2 and 3 July 1850. He studied law in Paris and received his doctorate in 1850. Because of his Calvinist persuasion, he became interested in charity work and social problems early on. In 1859, he took over the chairmanship of the Geneva Society for Public Welfare. He was also active in around 40 additional charitable organizations and groups involved in tasks from improving conditions for prison inmates to caring for orphans.

In 1862, Dunant sent him a copy of his book A Memory of Solferino. Moynier showed great interest in the realization of Dunant's ideas for the creation of a voluntary care organization for the assistance of the wounded in battle and opened a discussion about the book at the assembly of the Geneva Society for Public Welfare. This led to the creation of the Committee of Five, a commission of the society set up to investigate the plausibility of Dunant's ideas. The additional members of the commission, with Moynier as chairman, were Dunant, the doctors Louis Appia and Théodore Maunoir and the army general Guillaume-Henri Dufour. Soon afterwards, the committee members changed the name to the International Committee for Relief to the Wounded and, in 1876, it adopted its current name, the International Committee of the Red Cross (ICRC). Dufour was the first president of the Committee, and Moynier became its vice-president.

== Term as president of the ICRC ==
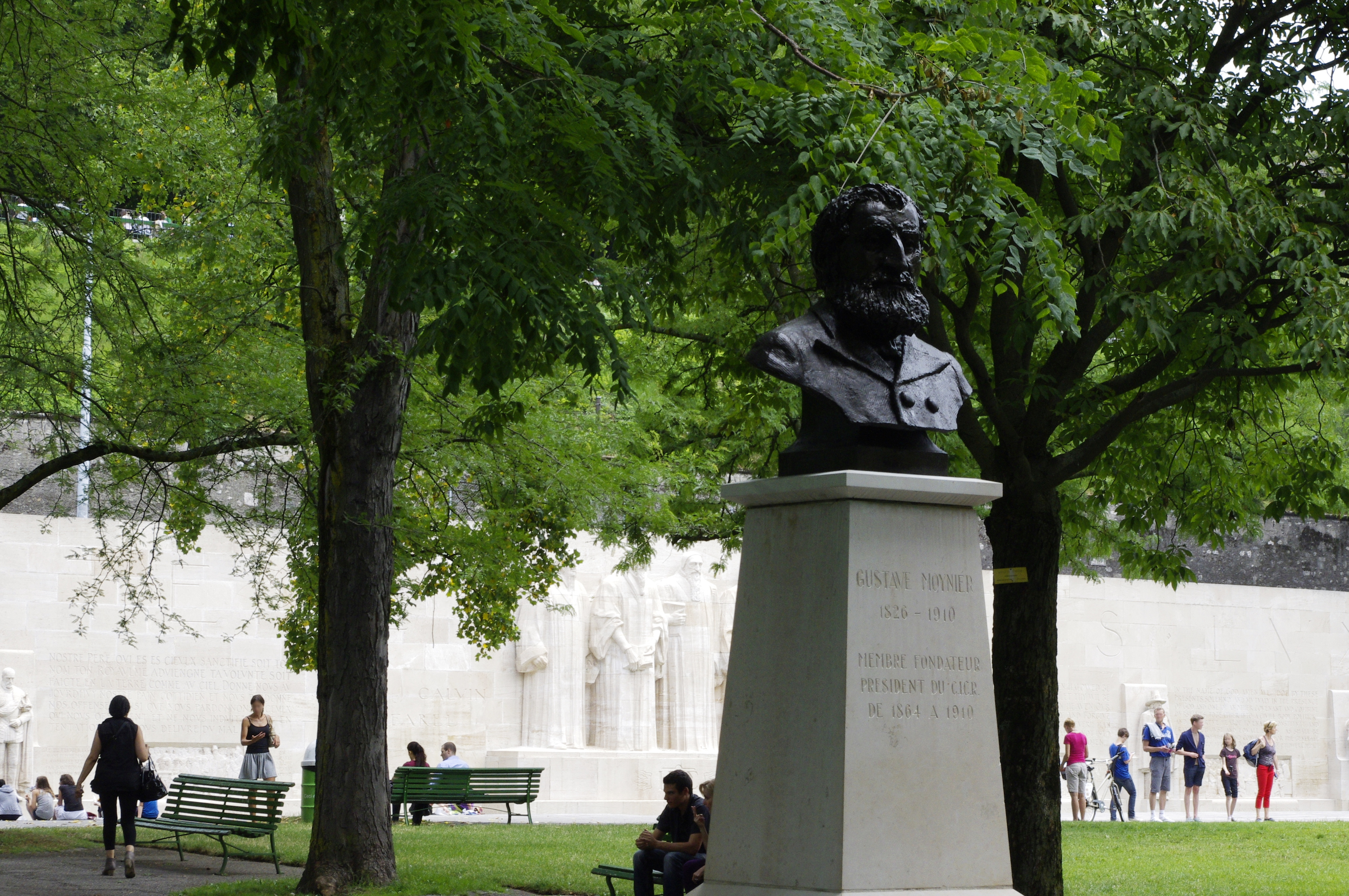
Monument to Moynier in Geneva's Parc des Bastions

Differences between Moynier and Dunant developed early over the reach of the organization's authority and its legal and organizational formation. The key point of dispute was Dunant's idea to grant neutrality to wounded soldiers and medical staff in order to protect them. Moynier was a determined opponent of this plan, which he did not consider realistic, and thought its insistence risked the collapse of the project. Dunant, however, was able to persuade powerful political and military figures in Europe of his ideas, and with the first Geneva Convention in 1864 had some success toward their implementation. In the same year however, Moynier took over the position of president of the International Committee. In 1864, he also became the Swiss ambassador along with General Dufour and Doctor Lehmann. In 1864, he became president of the International Conference of the Red Cross in Geneva. The increasing tensions between the pragmatist Moynier and the idealist Dunant led to Dunant's expulsion, led by Moynier, after Dunant's bankruptcy in 1867. In April 1867, the dissolution of Crédit Genevois, a financing company on whose board of directors Henri Dunant was a member, took place. He was forced to announce the bankruptcy of his company, while his family and friends were also implicated through their investments. On 17 August, Henri Dunant was convicted by the Geneva commercial court of fraudulent bankruptcy, leading to requests for his withdrawal from the international committee. On 25 August, he resigned from his position as secretary of the committee and was completely excluded from it on 8 September. While not proven, it is probable that Moynier used his influence to prevent Dunant, who from then on lived in rather poor conditions, from receiving financial assistance from his various supporters in Europe. For example, the gold medal of the Sciences Morales at the Paris World's Fair in 1867 was not awarded to Dunant but divided between Dunant, Moynier and Dufour. The prize money was also not awarded to Dunant but given to the International Committee itself. An offer from Napoleon III to settle half of Dunant's debt if the other half would be taken over by Dunant's friends was thwarted by Moynier's efforts.

In 1872, Moynier submitted, after the Franco-Prussian War in 1870-71, a proposal for the creation of an international arbitration court to penalize violations of international humanitarian law (particularly regarding the protection of medical and healthcare personnel during wartime). Because of concerns by most national governments over state sovereignty, the measure was not adopted. In 1879, he founded the monthly magazine L'Afrique explorée et civilisée, and subsequently became Consul General of the Congo in Switzerland from 1890 to 1904. In 1892, he also became president of the Institute of International Law. In 1898, he relinquished the active presidency of the International Committee of the Red Cross. In 1898, Louis Appia died, leaving Moynier as the only remaining member of the Committee of Five at Red Cross headquarters. The other surviving founding member was Henri Dunant, but he had ceased his official activities with the Red Cross since 1867. At that time, Moynier was president, but was beginning to show his age. He had problems with his pharynx, which made it difficult for him to speak. In October of that year, he announced his intention to retire, but this declaration triggered such a wave of dismay that he ultimately agreed to simply reduce his workload.

Moynier was nominated for the Nobel Peace Prize in 1901, 1902, 1903 and 1905 by Richard Kleen, a member of the Institut de droit international (Institute of International Law). Unlike Dunant who was awarded the first Peace Prize in 1901 together with Frédéric Passy, Moynier never received the prize in his own name, although the Institute that he had founded received the honor in 1904. He died in 1910, two months before Dunant, without any sort of reconciliation between the two. Having been president of the committee until his death, he is still the committee's longest-serving president.

== Legacy ==
The Rue Gustave-Moynier, in Secheron, Geneva's diplomatic quarter, is named after him and part of the nearby Parc Mon Repos is known as the Parc Moynier. Among the five founding members, Gustave Moynier is one of the few who does not have an avenue named after him in Geneva. Louis Appia, General Dufour, and Henri Dunant each have one. A street bears the name of Maunoir. The only remaining traces of Moynier are his villa and the park in front of it, which still bear his name, a small alleyway, and a bust in the Parc des Bastions.

There is a statue of Moynier in the Parc des Bastions, next to the University of Geneva. "La Paisible", the estate of the Gustave Moynier family, was located in Ferney-Voltaire (France), currently at 26 rue de Gex. 46.260991°N 6.105299°E Moynier is buried in Geneva at the Cemetery of Kings.
