= Théodore Maunoir =

Swiss surgeon (1806–1869)

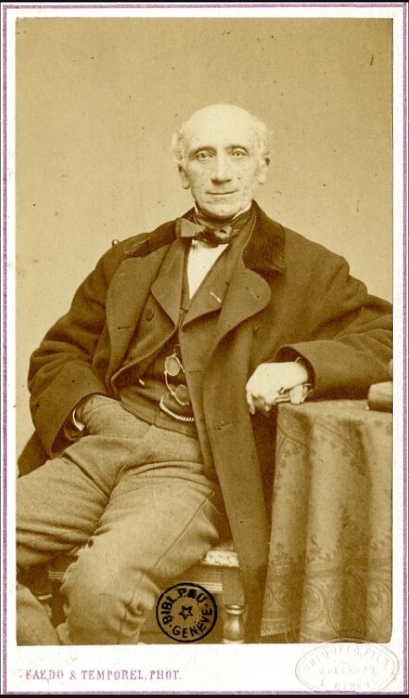
Undated photo of Maunoir

Dr. Théodore Maunoir (1 June 1806 – 26 April 1869) was a Swiss surgeon and co-founder of the International Committee of the Red Cross (ICRC).

Théodore Maunoir was born to a wealthy family of doctors in Geneva. Following family tradition he studied medicine in England and France and gained his doctorate in surgery in 1833. After his return to his home city, he became a member of the Geneva Commission for Hygiene and Health and the Geneva Society for Public Welfare. He was considered extremely intelligent and charming with an excellent sense of humor. When he married for the first time, he took on additional children from his wife's previous marriage. When she died, he married again and had further children with his second wife. His family, especially in his efforts in raising his children, played a large role in his life aside from his work as a doctor and medical consultant.

After the publication of Henry Dunant's book A Memory of Solferino in 1862, Maunoir, together with Gustave Moynier, Guillaume-Henri Dufour and Louis Appia, joined the "Committee of Five" which was founded in February 1863 as a commission of the Geneva Society for Public Welfare. Soon afterwards, the five men decided to rename the committee to the "International Committee for Relief to Wounded Soldiers", which by 1876 evolved into the "International Committee of the Red Cross" (ICRC). In the initial meetings of committee, Maunoir supported Dunant's ideas to propel the concepts behind the Red Cross into a widespread social movement reaching out to as many people as possible, instead of only creating an organization through negotiations with powerful political and military figures.

From 26 to 29 October 1863, an international conference took place in Geneva to examine the practical implementation of Dunant's ideas. When differences between the delegates about the use of volunteers in caring for the wounded threatened to cause the conference to fail, Maunoir gave a persuasive speech that helped avert this result.

Maunoir was especially close friends with Louis Appia, who was also a professional surgeon. Maunoir was a sort of mentor in Geneva society to 12-years younger Appia, who had only first come to Geneva at the age of 31. Maunoir remained a member of the ICRC until his early and unexpected death in 1869. His successor in the committee was the local Geneva politician Louis Micheli de la Rive.
