= Mirjana Spoljaric Egger =

President of the International Committee of the Red Cross

Mirjana Spoljaric

President of the International Committee of the Red Cross
- Incumbent
- Assumed office October 2022
- Vice President: Jürg Lauber
- Preceded by: Peter Maurer

Personal details
- Born: 1971 (age 54–55) Ludbreg, SR Croatia, SFR Yugoslavia
- Education: University of Basel; University of Geneva

Mirjana Spoljaric Egger (Croatian: Špoljarić; Croatian pronunciation: [ʃpɔʎarit͡ɕ]; born 1971) is a Swiss-Croatian diplomat. Since October 2022, she has served as the President of the International Committee of the Red Cross.

== Education ==
Spoljaric studied philosophy, economics and international law at the University of Basel and the University of Geneva. She finished her studies with a master's degree. She then worked as a research assistant at the Faculty of Law of the University of Basel.

From 2004 to 2006, she taught on global governance in the Department of Sociology at the University of Lucerne.

On January 23, 2026, Egger was awarded with an honorary doctorate by Maastricht University during the university's 50th Dies Natalis celebration.

== Career ==
=== Swiss Government ===
In 2000, she joined the Federal Department of Foreign Affairs, where she held various positions, including in Bern and New York.

She served as ambassador and head of the Swiss foreign affairs department’s division for the UN and other international organizations, where she was instrumental in shaping coherent Swiss policies and priorities in the main UN organs and conferences and representing Switzerland in multilateral processes. She also had responsibility for International Geneva and Switzerland's host country policy.

Earlier in her career, Ms Spoljaric worked in the Swiss embassy in Cairo, Egypt, and was desk officer for International Finance Institutions at the Swiss State Secretariat for Economic Affairs.

=== United Nations ===
From 2010 to 2012, Egger was posted to Amman as a senior adviser at the office of the UN Commissioner General for the United Nations Relief Agency for Palestinian Refugees and Refugees (UNRWA).

From 2012, she was ambassador, head of the Division of United Nations and International Organizations. She represented Switzerland in the negotiations on the UN reforms and the UN budget, in the Security Council, in the General Assembly, in the Economic and Social Council of the United Nations, in the Commission for Peace Consolidation, in the Human Rights Council and in the UN Office for Drugs and Crime.

From August 2018, Spoljaric served as the United Nations Assistant Secretary-General, Assistant Administrator of the UN Development Programme (UNDP), and Director of the Regional Bureau for Europe and the CIS. Those positions were succeeded by Ivana Živković from Croatia in September 2022.

=== International Committee of the Red Cross ===
In November 2021, the Assembly of the International Committee of the Red Cross elected Mirjana Spoljaric as President of the International Committee of the Red Cross (ICRC) with effect from 1 October 2022 in place of Peter Maurer. She is the first woman in this office.

In this role, and as chair of both the Assembly and Assembly Council, Spoljaric oversees ICRC’s humanitarian work globally, including its 17,000 staff working in 90 countries and an annual budget of approximately 1.8 billion CHF.

As the organisation’s chief diplomat, she steers ICRC’s external relations with states, parties to conflict and others who influence how wars are fought to promote respect for international humanitarian law and to facilitate the delivery of humanitarian assistance to those in need.

In her first term as ICRC president, Spoljaric transformed the ICRC’s approach to financial management and led a new institutional strategy focused on where the ICRC is uniquely placed to deliver. In September 2024, she launched, together with six states, the Global Initiative to galvanize political commitment to international humanitarian law – an exceptional effort to revive respect for the rules of war among states.
