= Ivana Živković =

United Nations official; Croatian diplomat

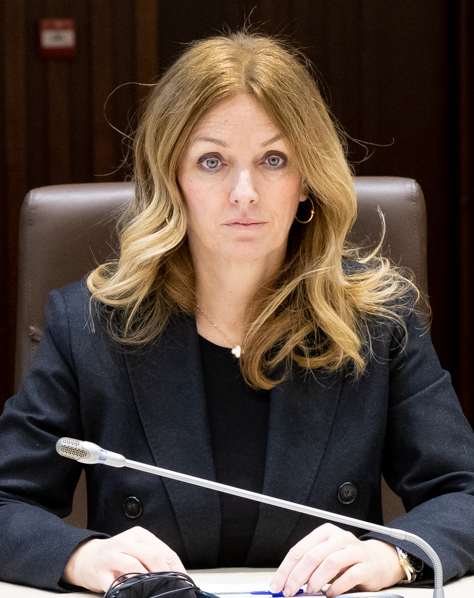

United Nations Assistant Secretary-General

Vice-Chair
- Incumbent
- Assumed office September 2022
- Appointed by: António Guterres
- Preceded by: Mirjana Spoljaric Egger

United Nations Development Programme Assistant Administrator and Director of the Regional Bureau for Europe and the CIS
- Incumbent
- Assumed office September 2022
- Appointed by: António Guterres
- Preceded by: Mirjana Spoljaric Egger

Ministry of Foreign and European Affairs (Croatia) Director-General for Economic Affairs and Development Cooperation
- Incumbent
- Assumed office January 2020
- Appointed by: Gordan Grlić Radman
- Preceded by: Andreja Metelko-Zgombić

Personal details
- Citizenship: (Croatia) Croatian
- Education: University of Zagreb

Ivana Živković is a Croatian Assistant Secretary-General of the United Nations and Assistant Administrator and Director, Regional Bureau for Europe and the Commonwealth of Independent States, of the United Nations Development Programme (UNDP) since September 2022. She is also the Director-General for Economic Affairs and Development Cooperation of Ministry of Foreign and European Affairs of the Republic of Croatia since 2020.

== Education ==
Ivana Živković obtained a Master’s degree in International Economics from the Faculty of Economics, University of Zagreb and a Bachelor of Economics from the University of Zagreb.

== Career ==
=== Croatia and European Union ===
Živković started her career at the Ministry of Foreign and European Affairs of the Republic of Croatia, held a number of positions and had a leading role in drafting and developing the framework for international development cooperation in Croatia. During Croatia’s Presidency of the Council of the European Union, she led the coordination of the trade and development portfolios. She also represented Croatia in various international fora, such as the UN General Assembly, the UN Economic and Social Council, the OECD Development Assistance Committee, and the EU Foreign Affairs Council.

She served as the Director-General for Economic Affairs and Development Cooperation in the Ministry of Foreign and European Affairs of Croatia since 2020.

=== United Nations ===
Živković has been working for the United Nations Development Programme (UNDP) since 2022. She is the Assistant Secretary-General, Assistant Administrator and Director of the Regional Bureau for Europe and the Commonwealth of Independent States (RBEC). As the head of RBEC, she oversees UNDP’s work in 18 countries and territories in Europe and Central Asia, supporting them to achieve the Sustainable Development Goals and respond to the COVID-19 pandemic. She also leads UNDP’s engagement with regional organizations, such as the European Union, the Council of Europe, and the Organization for Security and Co-operation in Europe.

=== Notable activities ===
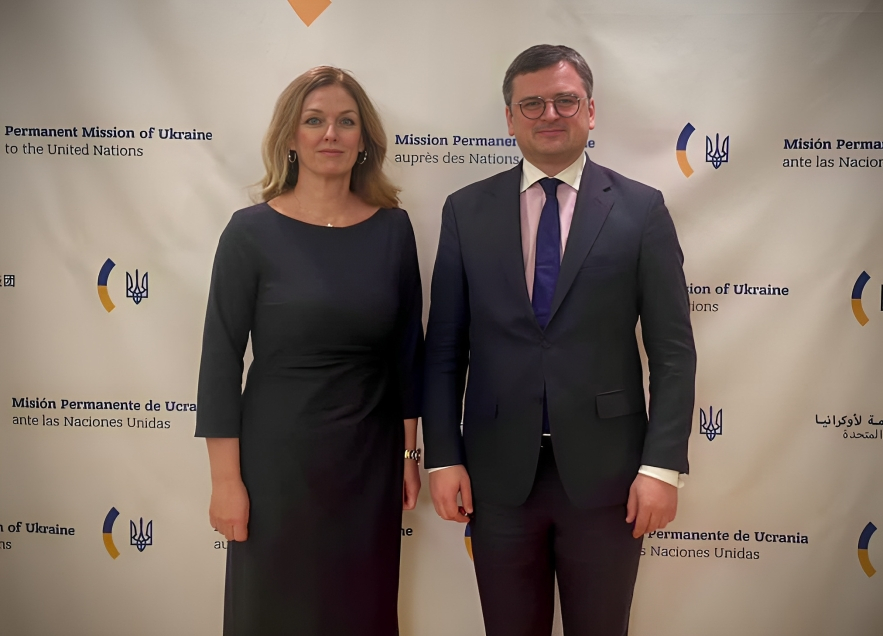
February 2023, Dmytro Kuleba(right) had a meeting with UN Assistant Secretary-General Ivana Živković(left)

Živković visited Ukraine in January 2023 to meet with government officials and national partners and to reaffirm existing UNDP commitments to support the country’s efforts to tackle the full spectrum of impacts from the war.

She co-chaired the first Regional Dialogue on Green Recovery in Europe and Central Asia, which was held on April 14, 2023, bringing together representatives from governments, civil society, the private sector, academia, and international organizations to exchange best practices and identify opportunities for green recovery from COVID-19.

In June 2023, Živković attended Astana International Forum, where she participated as a speaker. She discussed the UNDP’s priorities and initiatives in promoting the achievement of the Sustainable Development Goals (SDGs) in Kazakhstan, especially in the areas of digitalization, gender equality, and green recovery.
