= International Committee of the Red Cross =

Humanitarian non-governmental organization

- Comité international de la Croix-Rouge; Comité Internacional de la Cruz Roja
- Formation: 17 February 1863; 163 years ago
- Founder: Henry Dunant
- Type: Humanitarian aid organization
- Purpose: Protecting victims of armed conflicts and providing them with assistance
- Headquarters: Geneva, Switzerland
- Coordinates: 46°13′40″N 6°8′14″E
- Region served: Worldwide
- President: Mirjana Spoljaric Egger
- Vice President: Jürg Lauber
- Director-General: Pierre Krähenbühl
- Parent organization: International Red Cross and Red Crescent Movement
- Budget: CHF 1,8 billion (2026); 199.9 million for headquarters 1,6 billion for field operations
- Employees: 17,337(2025)
- Award: Nobel Peace Prize (1917, 1944, 1963)
- Website: www.icrc.org

The International Committee of the Red Cross (Note: French: Comité International de la Croix-Rouge, Spanish: Comité Internacional de la Cruz Roja) (ICRC) is a humanitarian aid organization based in Geneva, Switzerland, and is a three-time Nobel Prize laureate. The organization has played an instrumental role in the development of rules of war and promoting humanitarian norms. An international non-governmental organization, it has responsibility for promoting and ensuring respect for the four 1949 Geneva Conventions for the Protection of War Victims: the Convention for the Amelioration of the Wounded and Sick in Armed Forces in the Field; the Convention for the Amelioration of the Condition of the Wounded, Sick, and Shipwrecked Members of Armed Forces at Sea; The Convention relative to the Treatment of Prisoners of War; and the Convention relative to the Protection of Civilian Persons in Time of War.

State parties (signatories) to the Geneva Convention of 1949 and its Additional Protocols of 1977 (Protocol I, Protocol II) and 2005 have given the ICRC a mandate to protect victims of international and internal armed conflicts. Such victims include war wounded persons, prisoners, refugees, and non-combatants, including civilians. Thus, there has been a close relationship between the ICRC and the development of the law of war, also known as international humanitarian law.

The ICRC is part of the International Red Cross and Red Crescent Movement, along with the International Federation of Red Cross and Red Crescent Societies (IFRC) and 191 National Societies. It is the oldest and most honoured organization within the movement and one of the most widely recognized organizations in the world, having won three Nobel Peace Prizes (in 1917, 1944, and 1963).

== History ==
=== Solferino, Henry Dunant and the foundation of the ICRC ===
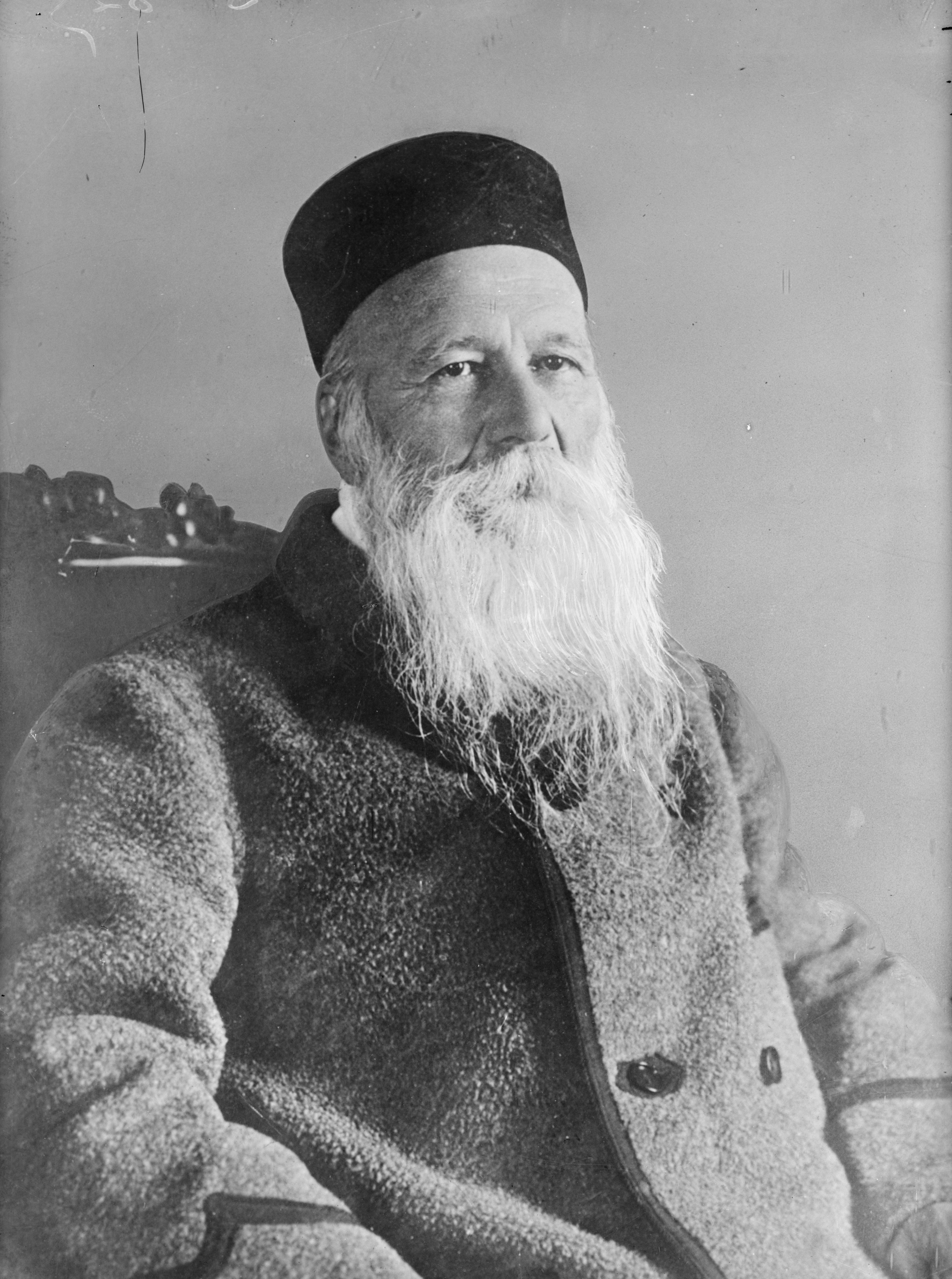
Henry Dunant, author of A Memory of Solferino

Up until the middle of the 19th century, there were no organized and well-established army nursing systems for casualties and no safe and protected institutions to accommodate and treat those who were wounded on the battlefield. In June 1859, the Swiss businessman Henry Dunant travelled to Italy to meet French emperor Napoléon III with the intention of discussing difficulties in conducting business in Algeria, at that time occupied by France. When he arrived in the small Italian town of Solferino on the evening of 24 June, he witnessed the aftermath of the Battle of Solferino, an engagement in the Second Italian War of Independence. In a single day, about 40,000 soldiers on both sides died or were left wounded on the field. Henry Dunant was shocked by the terrible aftermath of the battle, the suffering of the wounded soldiers, and the near-total lack of medical attendance and basic care. He completely abandoned the original intent of his trip and for several days he devoted himself to helping with the treatment and care for the wounded. He succeeded in organizing an overwhelming level of relief assistance by motivating the local population to aid without discrimination. Back in his home in Geneva, he decided to write a book titled A Memory of Solferino which he published with his own money in 1862. He sent copies of the book to leading political and military figures throughout Europe. In addition to penning a vivid description of his experiences in Solferino in 1859, he explicitly advocated the formation of national voluntary relief organizations to help nurse wounded soldiers in the case of war. In addition, he called for the development of international treaties to guarantee the neutrality and protection of those wounded on the battlefield as well as medics and field hospitals.

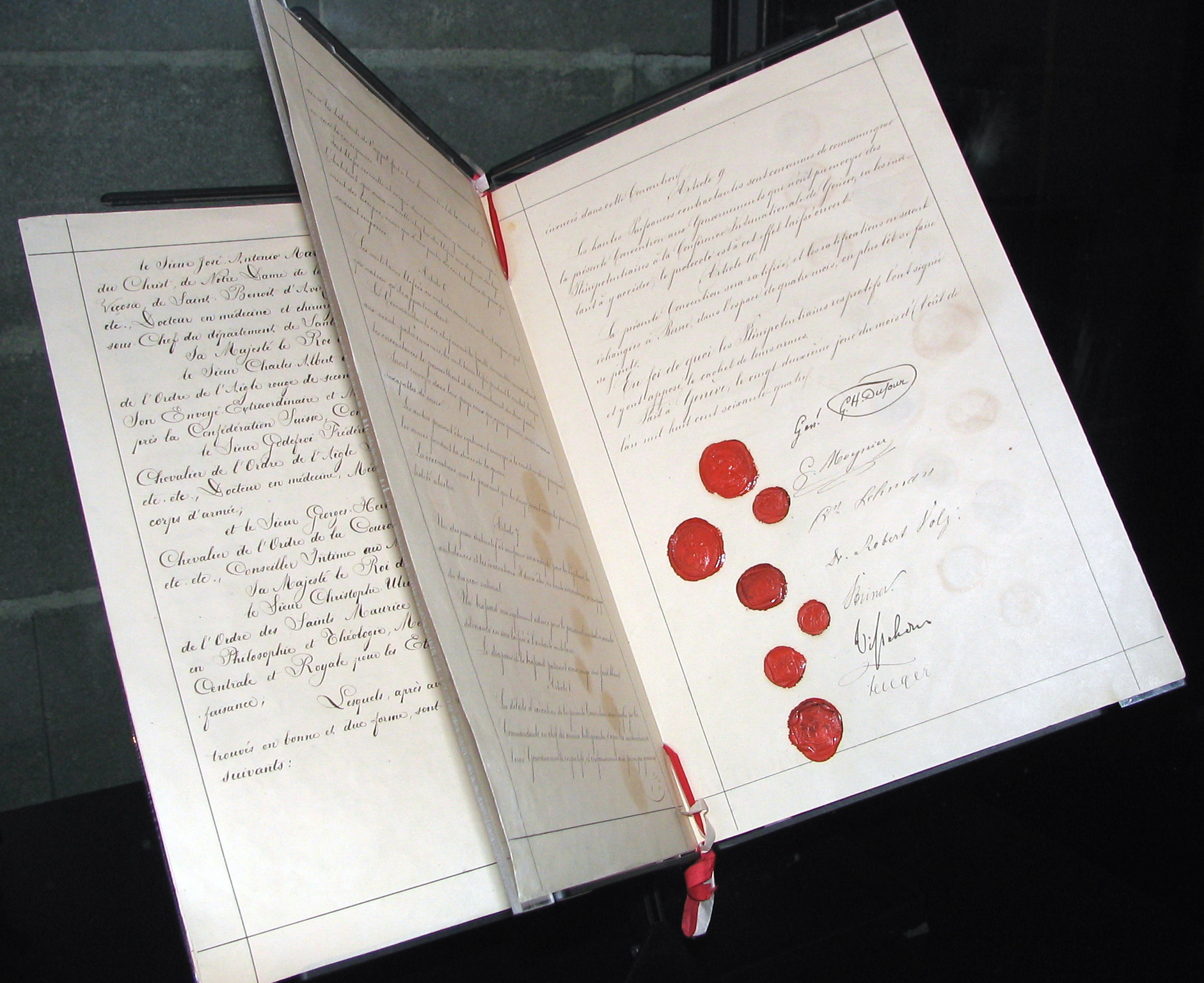
Original document of the first Geneva Convention, 1864

On 9 February 1863, the Geneva Society for Public Welfare held a meeting where it was decided to give serious consideration to the suggestions made in Dunant's book and appointed five of its members to form a Sub-committee charged with the preparation of a Memorandum on these matters for submission to the Welfare Congress to be held in Berlin in September 1863. The members of this Sub-committee, aside from Dunant himself, were Gustave Moynier, lawyer and chairman of the Geneva Society for Public Welfare; physician Louis Appia, who had significant experience working as a field surgeon; Appia's friend and colleague Théodore Maunoir, from the Geneva Hygiene and Health Commission; and Guillaume-Henri Dufour, a Swiss Army general of great renown.

Eight days later, on 17 February 1863, the five men held the first meeting of the Sub-committee and decided the Sub-committee should declare itself constituted a "Permanent International Committee", which would thus continue to exist as an "International Committee for Relief of Wounded in the event of War" after its mandate from the Geneva Society for Public Welfare had expired.

Among other activities, the Committee organized an international conference in Geneva in October (26–29) 1863 to develop possible measures to improve medical services on the battlefield. The conference was attended by 36 individuals: eighteen official delegates from national governments, six delegates from other non-governmental organizations, seven non-official foreign delegates, and the five members of the committee. The states and kingdoms represented by official delegates were Grand Duchy of Baden, Kingdom of Bavaria, Second French Empire, United Kingdom of Great Britain and Ireland, Kingdom of Hanover, Grand Duchy of Hesse, Kingdom of Italy, Kingdom of the Netherlands, Austrian Empire, Kingdom of Prussia, Russian Empire, Kingdom of Saxony, United Kingdoms of Sweden and Norway, and Spanish Empire. Among the proposals written in the final resolutions of the conference, adopted on 29 October 1863, were:

- The foundation of national relief societies for wounded soldiers;
- Neutrality and protection for wounded soldiers;
- The utilization of volunteer forces for relief assistance on the battlefield;
- The organization of additional conferences to enact these concepts in legally binding international treaties; and
- The introduction of a common distinctive protection symbol for medical personnel in the field, namely a white armlet bearing a red cross, honouring the history of neutrality of Switzerland and of its own Swiss organizers by reversing the Swiss flag's colours.

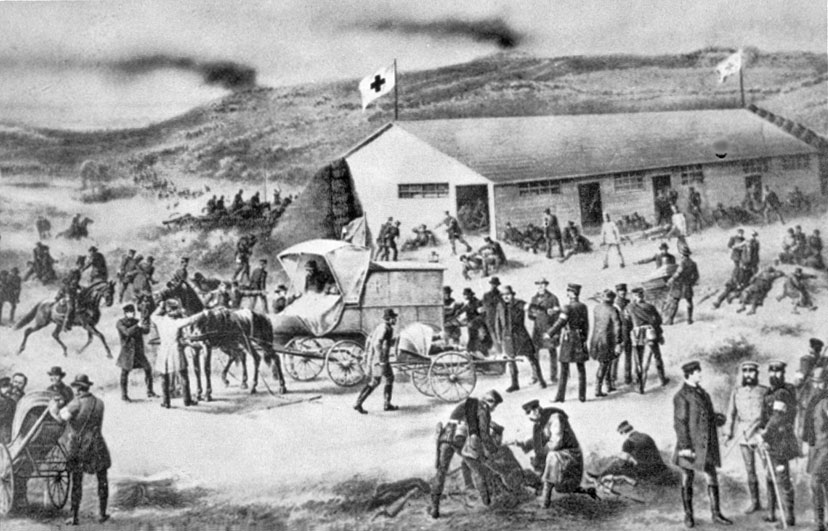
The Red Cross in action in 1864

Only one year later, the Swiss government invited the governments of all European countries, as well as the United States, Brazil, and Mexico, to attend an official diplomatic conference. Sixteen countries sent a total of twenty-six delegates to Geneva. On 22 August 1864, the conference adopted the First Geneva Convention "for the Amelioration of the Condition of the Wounded in Armies in the Field". Representatives of 12 states and kingdoms signed the convention:

- Swiss Confederation
- Grand Duchy of Baden
- Kingdom of Belgium
- Kingdom of Denmark
- Kingdom of Spain
- French Empire
- Grand Duchy of Hesse
- Kingdom of Italy
- Kingdom of the Netherlands
- Kingdom of Portugal and the Algarves
- Kingdom of Prussia
- Kingdom of Württemberg

The convention contained ten articles, establishing for the first time legally binding rules guaranteeing neutrality and protection for wounded soldiers, field medical personnel, and specific humanitarian institutions in an armed conflict. Furthermore, the convention defined two specific requirements for recognition of a national relief society by the International Committee:

- The national society must be recognized by its own national government as a relief society according to the convention, and
- The national government of the respective country must be a state party to the Geneva Convention.

Directly following the establishment of the Geneva Convention, the first national societies were founded in Belgium, Denmark, France, Oldenburg, Prussia, Spain, and Württemberg. Also in 1864, Louis Appia and Charles van de Velde, a captain of the Dutch Army, became the first independent and neutral delegates to work under the symbol of the Red Cross in an armed conflict. Three years later in 1867, the first International Conference of National Aid Societies for the Nursing of the War Wounded was convened.

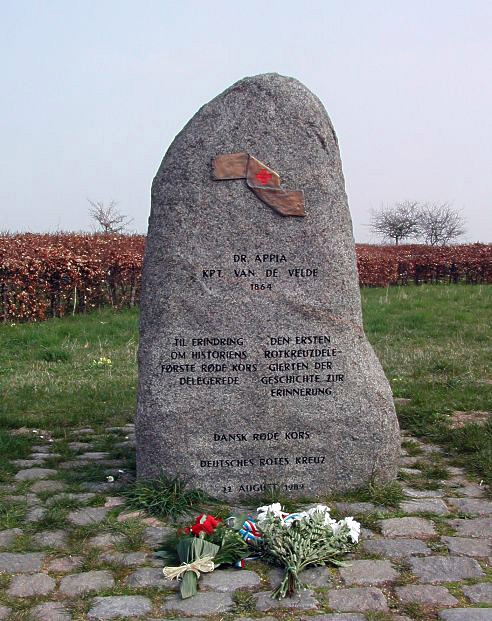
Memorial commemorating the first use of the Red Cross symbol in an armed conflict during the Battle of Dybbøl (Denmark) in 1864; jointly erected in 1989 by the national Red Cross societies of Denmark and Germany

Also in 1867, Henry Dunant was forced to declare bankruptcy due to business failures in Algeria, partly because he had neglected his business interests during his tireless activities for the International Committee. The controversy surrounding Dunant's business dealings and the resulting negative public opinion, combined with an ongoing conflict with Gustave Moynier, led to Dunant's expulsion from his position as a member and secretary. He was charged with fraudulent bankruptcy and a warrant for his arrest was issued. Thus, he was forced to leave Geneva and never returned to his home city.

In the following years, national societies were founded in nearly every country in Europe. The project resonated well with patriotic sentiments that were on the rise in the late-nineteenth-century, and national societies were often encouraged as signifiers of national moral superiority. In 1876, the committee adopted the name "International Committee of the Red Cross" (ICRC), which is still its official designation today. Five years later, the American Red Cross was founded through the efforts of Clara Barton. More and more countries signed the Geneva Convention and began to respect it in practice during armed conflicts. In a rather short period of time, the Red Cross gained huge momentum as an internationally respected movement, and the national societies became increasingly popular as a venue for volunteer work.

When the first Nobel Peace Prize was awarded in 1901, the Norwegian Nobel Committee opted to give it jointly to Henry Dunant and Frédéric Passy, a leading international pacifist. More significant than the honour of the prize itself, the official congratulation from the International Committee of the Red Cross marked the overdue rehabilitation of Henry Dunant and represented a tribute to his key role in the formation of the Red Cross. Dunant died nine years later in the small Swiss health resort of Heiden. Only two months earlier his long-standing adversary Gustave Moynier had also died, leaving a mark in the history of the committee as its longest-serving President ever.

In 1906, the 1864 Geneva Convention was revised for the first time. One year later, the Hague Convention X, adopted at the Second International Peace Conference in The Hague, extended the scope of the Geneva Convention to naval warfare. Shortly before the beginning of the First World War in 1914, 50 years after the foundation of the ICRC and the adoption of the first Geneva Convention, there were already 45 national relief societies throughout the world. The movement had extended itself beyond Europe and North America to Central and South America (Argentina, Brazil, Chile, Cuba, Mexico, Peru, El Salvador, Uruguay, Venezuela), Asia (the Republic of China, Japan, Korea, Siam), and Africa (South Africa).

=== World War I ===
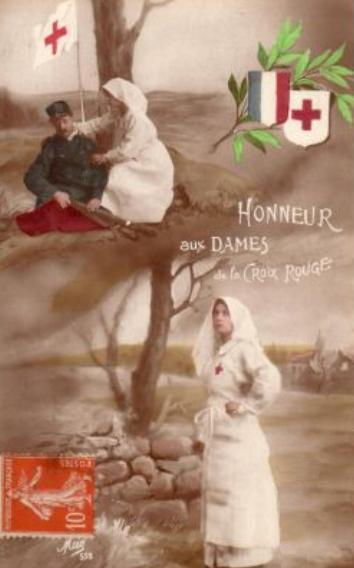
French postcard celebrating the role of Red Cross nurses during the First World War, 1915

With the outbreak of World War I, the ICRC found itself confronted with enormous challenges which it could only handle by working closely with the national Red Cross societies. Red Cross nurses from around the world, including the United States and Japan, came to support the medical services of the armed forces of the European countries involved in the war. On 15 October 1914, immediately after the start of the war, the ICRC set up its International Prisoners-of-War (POW) Agency, which had about 1,200 mostly volunteer staff members by the end of 1914. By the end of the war, the Agency had transferred about 20 million letters and messages, 1.9 million parcels, and about 18 million Swiss francs in monetary donations to POWs of all affected countries. Furthermore, due to the intervention of the Agency, about 200,000 prisoners were exchanged between the warring parties, released from captivity and returned to their home country. The organizational card index of the Agency accumulated about 7 million records from 1914 to 1923, each card representing an individual prisoner or missing person. The card index led to the identification of about 2 million POWs and the ability to contact their families, as part of the Restoring Family Links effort of the organization. The complete index is on loan today from the ICRC to the International Red Cross and Red Crescent Museum in Geneva. The right to access the index is still strictly restricted to the ICRC.

During the entire war, the ICRC monitored warring parties' compliance with the Geneva Conventions of the 1907 revision and forwarded complaints about violations to the respective country. When chemical weapons were used in this war for the first time in history, the ICRC vigorously protested against this new type of warfare. Even without having a mandate from the Geneva Conventions, the ICRC tried to ameliorate the suffering of civil populations. In territories that were officially designated as "occupied territories," the ICRC could assist the civilian population on the basis of the Hague Convention's "Laws and Customs of War on Land" of 1907. This convention was also the legal basis for the ICRC's work for prisoners of war. In addition to the work of the International Prisoner-of-War Agency as described above this included inspection visits to POW camps. A total of 524 camps throughout Europe were visited by 41 delegates from the ICRC until the end of the war.

Between 1916 and 1918, the ICRC published a number of postcards with scenes from the POW camps. The pictures showed the prisoners in day-to-day activities such as the distribution of letters from home. The intention of the ICRC was to provide the families of the prisoners with some hope and solace and to alleviate their uncertainties about the fate of their loved ones. After the end of the war, the ICRC organized the return of about 420,000 prisoners to their home countries. In 1920, the task of repatriation was handed over to the newly founded League of Nations, which appointed the Norwegian diplomat and scientist Fridtjof Nansen as its "High Commissioner for Repatriation of the War Prisoners". His legal mandate was later extended to support and care for war refugees and displaced persons when his office became that of the League of Nations "High Commissioner for Refugees". Nansen, who invented the Nansen passport for stateless refugees and was awarded the Nobel Peace Prize in 1922, appointed two delegates from the ICRC as his deputies.

A year before the end of the war, the ICRC received the 1917 Nobel Peace Prize for its outstanding wartime work. It was the only Nobel Peace Prize awarded in the period from 1914 to 1918.

After the war ended, Henry Pomeroy Davison, who had been Chairman of the War Council of the American Red Cross pressed for the creation of an international organization to coordinate the work of the different national Red Cross societies. Based on his recommendation, the League of Red Cross Societies was founded on 15 May 1919, by the societies of Great Britain, France, Japan, Italy, and the United States. Davison, wanted the League of Red Cross Societies to supersede the ICRC in controlling the Red Cross action in international affairs. He argued that:

It should be in reality, and not merely in name an International Committee, a Committee on which there will be representatives from all countries, instead of, as at present, a committee consisting of amiable but somewhat ineffective Geneva gentlemen. That which calls itself "international" has grown rather provincial… New blood, new methods, a new and more comprehensive outlook, these things are necessary.

The League was established in 1919 with Davison as its chairman. However, "Swiss aloofness or unilateralism was hard to overcome", and the relationship between the ICRC and the League became, and remained, a problem for years to come. The untimely death of Davison in 1922 after an operation will undoubtedly have had an adverse impact on the league's ability to counter what he saw as Swiss intransigence.

In 1923, the Committee adopted a change in its policy regarding the selection of new members. Until then, only citizens from the city of Geneva could serve in the committee. This limitation was expanded to include Swiss citizens. As a direct consequence of World War I, an additional protocol to the Geneva Convention was adopted in 1925 which outlawed the use of suffocating or poisonous gases and biological agents as weapons. Four years later, the original Convention was revised and the second Geneva Convention "relative to the Treatment of Prisoners of War" was established. The events of World War I and the respective activities of the ICRC significantly increased the reputation and authority of the Committee among the international community and led to an extension of its competencies.

As early as in 1934, a draft proposal for an additional convention for the protection of the civil population during an armed conflict was adopted by the International Red Cross Conference. Unfortunately, most governments had little interest in implementing this convention, and it was thus prevented from entering into force before the beginning of World War II.

=== Chaco War ===
In the Interwar period, Bolivia and Paraguay were disputing possession of the Gran Chaco – a desert region between the two countries. The dispute escalated into a full-scale conflict in 1932. During the war the ICRC visited 18,000 Bolivian prisoners of war and 2,500 Paraguayan detainees. With the help of the ICRC both countries made improvements to the conditions of the detainees.

=== World War II ===
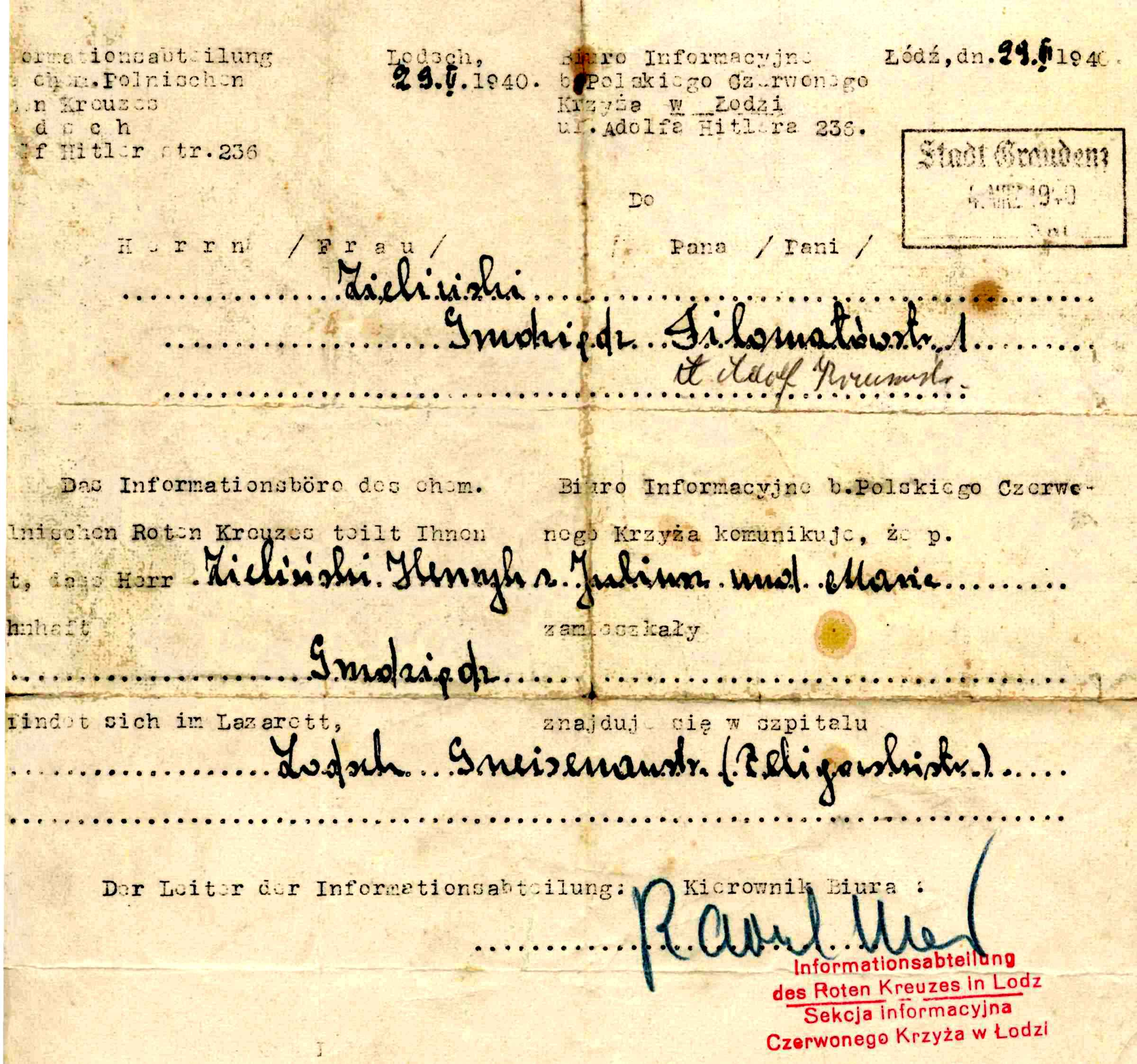
Red Cross message from Łódź, Poland, 1940

The most reliable primary source on the role of the Red Cross during World War II are the three volumes of the "Report of the International Committee of the Red Cross on its activities during the second world war (September 1, 1939 – June 30, 1947)" written by the International Committee of the Red Cross itself. The report can be read online.

The legal basis of the work of the ICRC during World War II was the Geneva Conventions (1929) revision, as well as the Convention relating to the International Status of Refugees, of 28 October 1933. The activities of the committee were similar to those during World War I: visiting and monitoring POW camps, organizing relief assistance for civilian populations, and administering the exchange of messages regarding prisoners and missing persons. By the end of the war, 179 delegates had conducted 12,750 visits to POW camps in 41 countries. The Central Information Agency on Prisoners-of-War (Zentralauskunftsstelle für Kriegsgefangene) had a staff of 3,000, the card index tracking prisoners contained 45 million cards, and 120 million messages were exchanged by the Agency. One major obstacle was that the Nazi-controlled German Red Cross refused to cooperate with the Geneva statutes including blatant violations such as the deportation of Jews from Germany and the mass murders conducted in the concentration camps run by the German government. Moreover, two other main parties to the conflict, the Soviet Union and Japan, were not party to the 1929 Geneva Conventions and were not legally required to follow the rules of the conventions.

During the war, the ICRC failed to obtain an agreement with Nazi Germany about the treatment of detainees in concentration camps, and it eventually abandoned applying pressure to avoid disrupting its work with POWs. There was no public condemnation of treatment in concentration camps, and a proposed 1942 appeal on the conduct of hostilities was abandoned. In addition, the ICRC failed to develop a response to reliable information about the extermination camps and the mass killing of European Jews. The ICRC considers this its greatest failure in its history.

After November 1943, the ICRC achieved permission to send parcels to concentration camp detainees with known names and locations. Because the notices of receipt for these parcels were often signed by other inmates, the ICRC managed to register the identities of about 105,000 detainees in the concentration camps and delivered about 1.1 million parcels, primarily to the camps Dachau, Buchenwald, Ravensbrück, and Sachsenhausen.

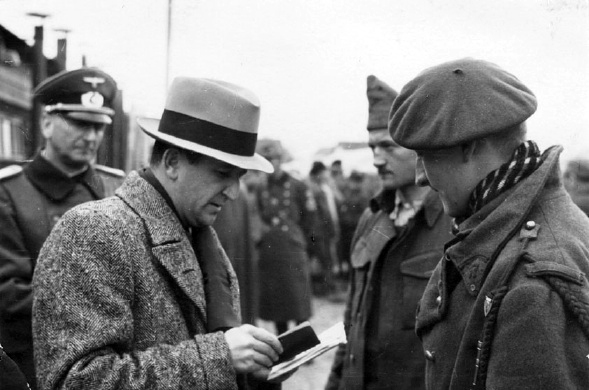
Marcel Junod, delegate of the ICRC, visiting POWs in Nazi Germany

Swiss historian Jean-Claude Favez, who conducted an 8-year review of the Red Cross records, says that even though the Red Cross knew by November 1942 about the Nazi's annihilation plans for the Jews – and even discussed it with U.S. officials – the group did nothing to inform the public, maintaining silence even in the face of pleas by Jewish groups.

Because the Red Cross was based in Geneva and largely funded by the Swiss government, it was sensitive to Swiss wartime attitudes and policies. In October 1942, the Swiss government and the Red Cross' board of members vetoed a proposal by several Red Cross board members to condemn the persecution of civilians by the Nazis. For the rest of the war, the Red Cross took its cues from Switzerland in avoiding acts of opposition or confrontation with the Nazis.

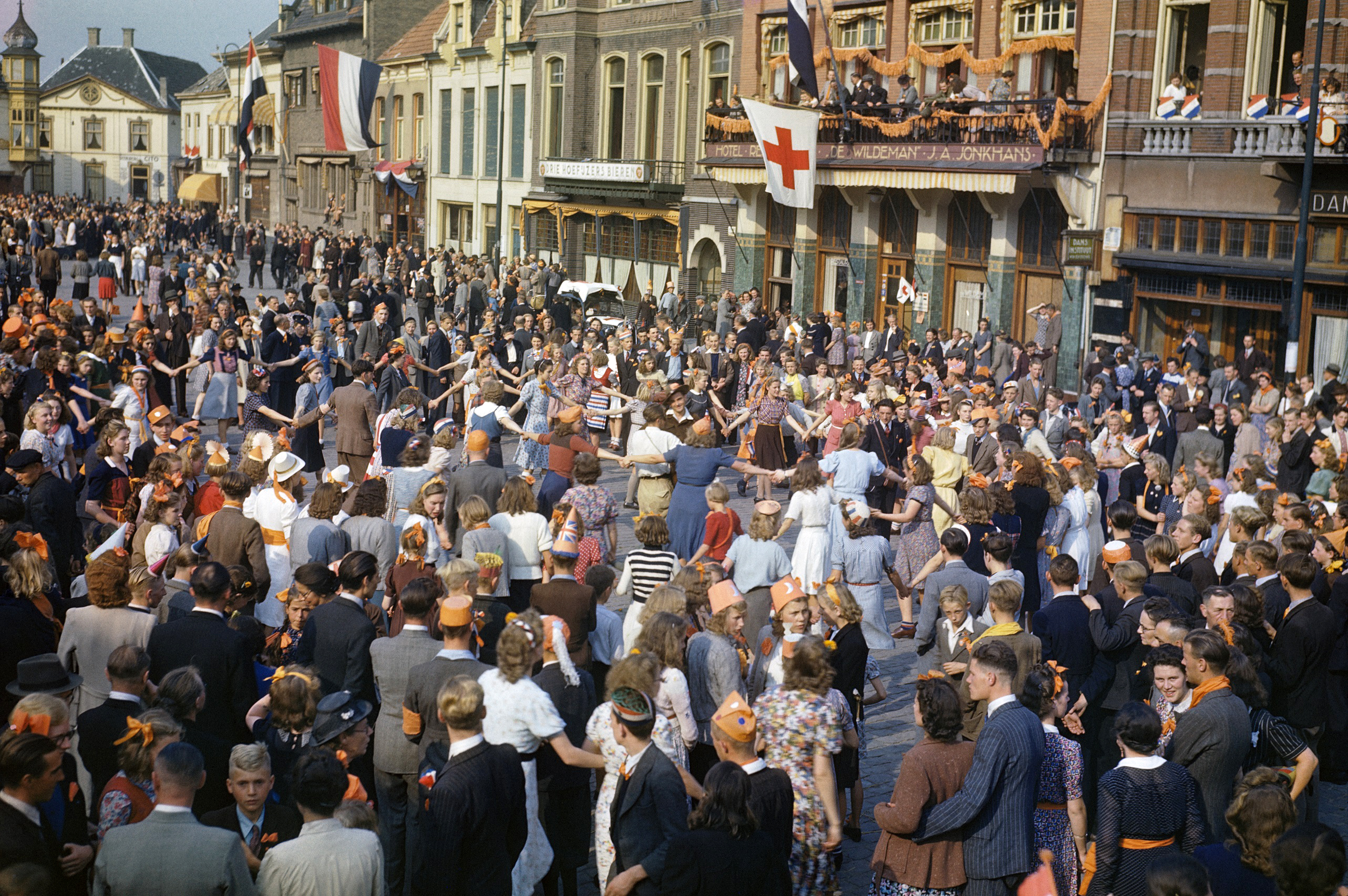
The Red Cross during liberation of Eindhoven in 1944

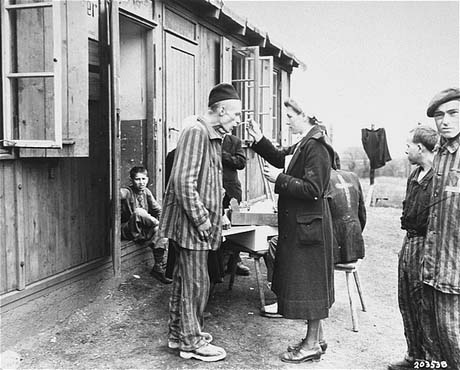
A sick Polish survivor in the Hannover-Ahlem concentration camp receives medicine from a German Red Cross worker, April 1945

On 12 March 1945, ICRC President Jacob Burckhardt received a message from SS General Ernst Kaltenbrunner accepting the ICRC's demand to allow delegates to visit the concentration camps. This agreement was bound by the condition that these delegates would have to stay in the camps until the end of the war. Ten delegates, among them Louis Haefliger (Mauthausen Camp), Paul Dunant (Theresienstadt Camp) and Victor Maurer (Dachau Camp), accepted the assignment and visited the camps. Louis Haefliger prevented the forceful eviction or blasting of Mauthausen-Gusen by alerting American troops, thereby saving the lives of about 60,000 inmates. His actions were condemned by the ICRC because they were deemed as acting unduly on his own authority and risking the ICRC's neutrality. Only in 1990 was his reputation finally rehabilitated by ICRC President Cornelio Sommaruga.

In 1944, the ICRC received its second Nobel Peace Prize. As in World War I, it received the only Peace Prize awarded during the main period of war, 1939 to 1945. At the end of the war, the ICRC worked with national Red Cross societies to organize relief assistance to those countries most severely affected. In 1948, the Committee published a report reviewing its war-era activities from 1 September 1939 to 30 June 1947. Since January 1996, the ICRC archive for this period has been open to academic and public research.

=== Rest of the 20th century ===
In December 1948 the ICRC was invited, along with the IFRC and AFSC, by the United Nations to take part in a $32 million emergency relief programme working with Palestinian refugees. The ICRC was given responsibility for the areas that are now the West Bank and Israel.

On 12 August 1949, further revisions to the existing two Geneva Conventions were adopted. An additional convention "for the Amelioration of the Condition of Wounded, Sick and Shipwrecked Members of Armed Forces at Sea", now called the second Geneva Convention, was brought under the Geneva Convention umbrella as a successor to the 1907 Hague Convention X. The 1929 Geneva convention "relative to the Treatment of Prisoners of War" may have been the second Geneva Convention from a historical point of view (because it was actually formulated in Geneva), but after 1949 it came to be called the third Convention because it came later chronologically than the Hague Convention. Reacting to the experience of World War II, the Fourth Geneva Convention, a new Convention "relative to the Protection of Civilian Persons in Time of War," was established. Also, the additional protocols of 8 June 1977 were intended to make the conventions apply to internal conflicts such as civil wars. Today, the four conventions and their added protocols contain more than 600 articles, a remarkable expansion when compared to the mere 10 articles in the first 1864 convention.

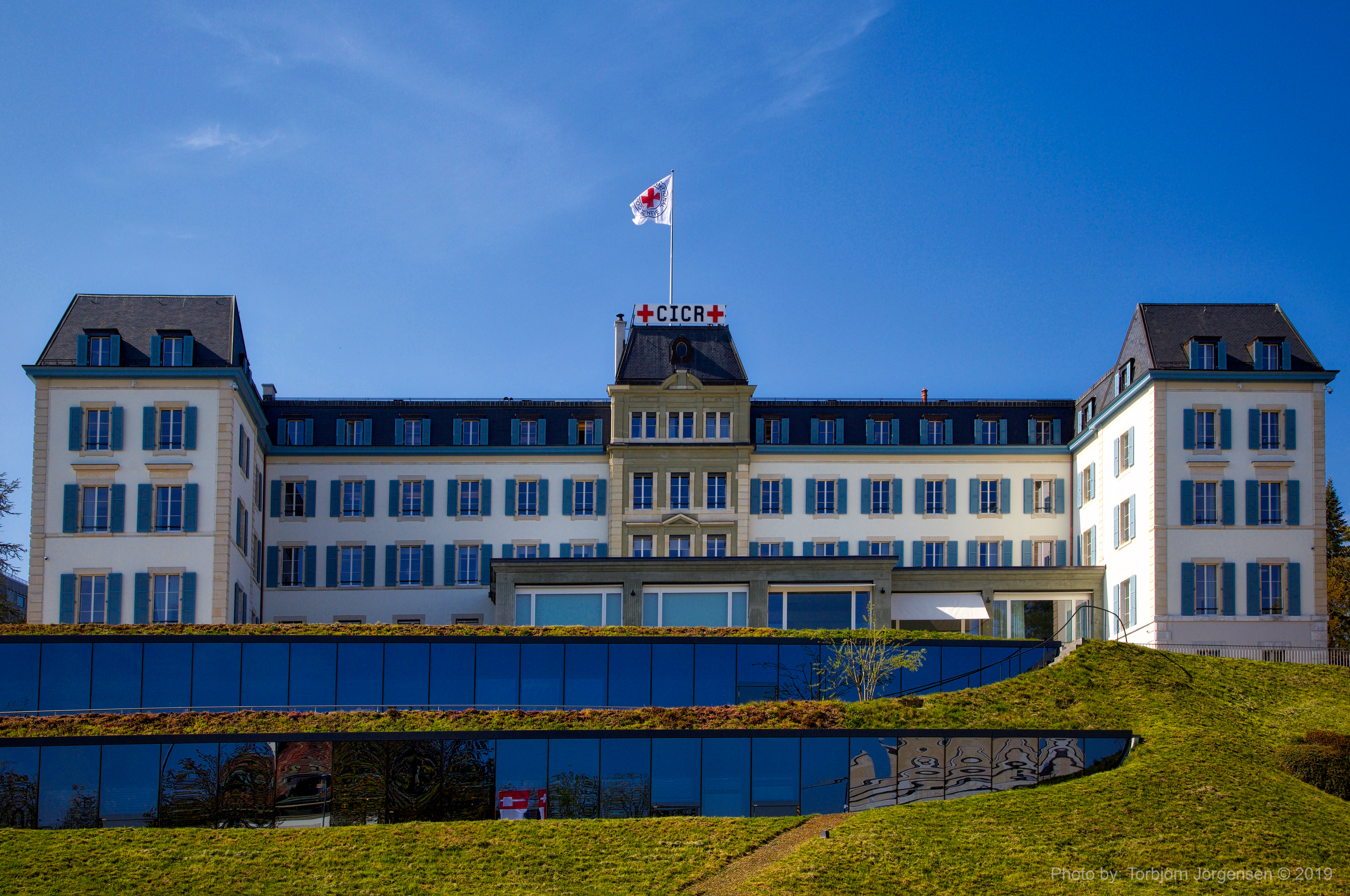
The ICRC Headquarters in Geneva

In celebration of its centennial in 1963, the ICRC, together with the League of Red Cross Societies, received its third Nobel Peace Prize. Since 1993, non-Swiss individuals have been allowed to serve as Committee delegates abroad, a task which was previously restricted to Swiss citizens. Indeed, since then, the share of staff without Swiss citizenship has increased to about 35%.

On 16 October 1990, the UN General Assembly decided to grant the ICRC observer status for its assembly sessions and sub-committee meetings, the first observer status given to a private organization. The resolution was jointly proposed by 138 member states and introduced by the Italian ambassador, Vieri Traxler, in memory of the organization's origins in the Battle of Solferino. An agreement with the Swiss government signed on 19 March 1993, affirmed the already long-standing policy of full independence of the committee from any possible interference by Switzerland. The agreement protects the full sanctity of all ICRC property in Switzerland including its headquarters and archive, grants members and staff legal immunity, exempts the ICRC from all taxes and fees, guarantees the protected and duty-free transfer of goods, services, and money, provides the ICRC with secure communication privileges at the same level as foreign embassies, and simplifies Committee travel in and out of Switzerland.

The ICRC continued its activities throughout the 1990s. It broke its customary media silence when it denounced the Rwandan genocide in 1994. It struggled to prevent the crimes that happened in and around Srebrenica in 1995 but admitted, "We must acknowledge that despite our efforts to help thousands of civilians forcibly expelled from the town and despite the dedication of our colleagues on the spot, the ICRC's impact on the unfolding of the tragedy was extremely limited." It went public once again in 2007 to decry "major human rights abuses" by Burma's military government including forced labour, starvation, and murder of men, women, and children.

=== The Holocaust memorial ===
By taking part in the 1995 ceremony to commemorate the liberation of the Auschwitz concentration camp, the President of the ICRC, Cornelio Sommaruga, sought to show that the organization was fully aware of the gravity of The Holocaust and the need to keep the memory of it alive, so as to prevent any repetition of it. He paid tribute to all those who had suffered or lost their lives during the war and publicly regretted the past mistakes and shortcomings of the Red Cross with regard to the victims of the concentration camps.

In 2002, an ICRC official outlined some of the lessons the organization has learned from the failure:

- from a legal point of view, the work that led to the adoption of the Geneva Convention relative to the protection of civilian persons in time of war;
- from an ethical point of view, the adoption of the declaration of the Fundamental Principles of the Red Cross and Red Crescent, building on the distinguished work of Max Huber and Jean Pictet, to prevent any more abuses such as those that occurred within the movement after Hitler rose to power in 1933;
- on a political level, the ICRC's relationship with Switzerland was redesigned to ensure its independence;
- with a view to keeping memories alive, the ICRC accepted, in 1955, to take over the direction of the International Tracing Service where records from concentration camps are maintained;
- finally, to establish the historical facts of the case, the ICRC invited Jean-Claude Favez to carry out an independent investigation of its activities on behalf of the victims of Nazi persecution, and gave him unfettered access to the ICRC archives relating to this period; out of concern for transparency, the ICRC also decided to give all other historians access to its archives dating back more than 50 years; having gone over the conclusions of Favez's work, the ICRC acknowledged its past failings and expressed its regrets in this regard.

In an official statement made on 27 January 2005, the 60th anniversary of the liberation of Auschwitz, the ICRC stated:

Auschwitz also represents the greatest failure in the history of the ICRC, aggravated by its lack of decisiveness in taking steps to aid the victims of Nazi persecution. This failure will remain part of the ICRC's memory, as will the courageous acts of individual ICRC delegates at the time.

=== Rules for cyberwarfare ===
On 4 October 2023 the committee issued a set of rules for civilian hackers to abide by.

== Staff fatalities ==
- Fernanda Calado (Spain), Ingeborg Foss (Norway), Nancy Malloy (Canada), Gunnhild Myklebust (Norway), Sheryl Thayer (New Zealand), and Hans Elkerbout (Netherlands). They were shot at point-blank range while sleeping in the early hours of 17 December 1996 in the ICRC field hospital in the Chechen city of Nowije Atagi near Grozny. Their murderers have never been caught and there was no apparent motive for the killings.
- Rita Fox (Switzerland), Véronique Saro (Democratic Republic of Congo, formerly Zaire), Julio Delgado (Colombia), Unen Ufoirworth (DR Congo), Aduwe Boboli (DR Congo), and Jean Molokabonge (DR Congo). On 26 April 2001, they were en route with two cars on a relief mission in the northeast of the Democratic Republic of Congo when they came under fatal fire from unknown attackers.
- Ricardo Munguia (El Salvador). He was working as a water engineer in Afghanistan and travelling from Kandahar to Tirin Kot with local colleagues on 27 March 2003 when their car was stopped by unknown armed men. He was killed execution-style at point-blank range while his colleagues were allowed to escape. He was 39 years old. The killing prompted the ICRC to temporarily suspend operations across Afghanistan. Thereby the assumption that ICRC's reputation for neutrality and effective work in Afghanistan over the past thirty years would protect its delegates was shattered.
- On 12 September 2024, three ICRC staff were killed after shelling hit an aid distribution site in Donetsk region. Another two were wounded. Their names have not yet been disclosed to the public.

In 2011, ICRC launched the Health Care in Danger campaign to highlight risks to humanitarian healthcare workers.

== Characteristics ==
The emblem of the International Committee of the Red Cross (French: Comité international de la Croix-Rouge)

The original motto of the International Committee of the Red Cross was Inter Arma Caritas ("Amidst War, Charity"). It has preserved this motto while other Red Cross organizations have adopted others. Due to Geneva's location in the French-speaking part of Switzerland, the ICRC is also known under its initial French name Comité international de la Croix-Rouge (CICR). However, the ICRC has three official languages (English, French and Spanish). The official symbol of the ICRC is the Red Cross on white background (the inverse of the Swiss flag) with the words "COMITE INTERNATIONAL GENEVE" circling the cross.

Under the Geneva Convention, the red cross, red crescent and red crystal emblems provide protection for military medical services and relief workers in armed conflicts and is to be placed on humanitarian and medical vehicles and buildings. The original emblem that has a red cross on a white background is the exact reverse of the flag of neutral Switzerland. It was later supplemented by two others which are the Red Crescent, and the Red Crystal. The Red Crescent was adopted by the Ottoman Empire during the Russo-Turkish war and the Red Crystal by the governments in 2005, as an additional emblem devoid of any national, political or religious connotation.

=== Mission ===
The official mission statement says that: "The International Committee of the Red Cross (ICRC) is an impartial, neutral, and independent organization whose exclusively humanitarian mission is to protect the lives and dignity of victims of war and internal violence and to provide them with assistance." It also conducts and coordinates international relief and works to promote and strengthen international humanitarian law and universal humanitarian principles. The core tasks of the committee, which are derived from the Geneva Conventions and its own statutes are:

- to monitor compliance of warring parties with the Geneva Conventions
- to organize nursing and care for those who are wounded on the battlefield
- to supervise the treatment of prisoners of war and make confidential interventions with detaining authorities
- to help with the search for missing persons in an armed conflict (tracing service)
- to organize protection and care for civil populations
- to act as a neutral intermediary between warring parties

The ICRC drew up seven fundamental principles in 1965 that were adopted by the entire Red Cross Movement. They are humanity, impartiality, neutrality, independence, volunteerism, unity, and universality.

=== Legal status ===
The ICRC is the only institution explicitly named in international humanitarian law as a controlling authority. The legal mandate of the ICRC stems from the four Geneva Conventions of 1949, as well as its own Statutes. The ICRC also undertakes tasks that are not specifically mandated by law, such as visiting political prisoners outside of conflict and providing relief in natural disasters.

The ICRC is a private Swiss association enjoying various degrees of special privileges and legal immunities within the territory of Switzerland. On 19 March 1993, a legal foundation for this special treatment was created by a formal agreement between the Swiss government and the ICRC. This agreement protects the full sanctity of all ICRC property in Switzerland including its headquarters and archive, grants members and staff legal immunity, exempts the ICRC from all taxes and fees, guarantees protected and duty-free transfer of goods, services, and money, provides the ICRC with secure communication privileges at the same level as foreign embassies, and simplifies Committee travel in and out of Switzerland. On the other hand, Switzerland does not recognize ICRC-issued passports.

Contrary to popular belief, the ICRC is not a sovereign entity like the Sovereign Military Order of Malta. The ICRC limits its membership to Swiss nationals only, and also it does not have a policy of open and unrestricted membership for individuals as its new members are selected by the Committee itself (a process called cooptation). However, since the early 1990s, the ICRC employs persons from all over the world to serve in its field mission and at Headquarters. In 2007, almost half of ICRC staff was non-Swiss. The ICRC has special privileges and legal immunities based on national law in client countries, based on agreements between the ICRC and the respective governments, or, in some cases, based on international jurisprudence (such as the right of ICRC delegates not to bear witness in front of international tribunals).

=== Legal basis ===
The ICRC's operations are generally based on international humanitarian law, primarily comprising the four Geneva Conventions of 1949, their two Additional Protocols of 1977 and Additional Protocol III of 2005, the Statutes of the International Red Cross and Red Crescent Movement, and the resolutions of the International Conferences of the Red Cross and Red Crescent.

International humanitarian law is founded upon the Geneva conventions, the first of which was signed in 1864 by 16 countries. The First Geneva Convention of 1949 covers the protection for the wounded and sick of armed conflict on land. The Second Geneva Convention asks for the protection and care for the wounded, sick and shipwrecked of armed conflict at sea. The Third Geneva Convention concerns the treatment of prisoners of war. The Fourth Geneva Convention concerns the protection of civilians in time of war. In addition, there are many more customary international laws that come into effect when necessary.

=== Funding and financial matters ===
The 2023 budget of the ICRC amounts to 2.5 billion Swiss francs. Most of that money comes from states, including Switzerland in its capacity as the depositary state of the Geneva Conventions, from national Red Cross societies, the signatory states of the Geneva Conventions, and from international organizations like the European Union. All payments to the ICRC are voluntary and are received as donations based on two types of appeals issued by the committee: an annual Headquarters Appeal to cover its internal costs and Emergency Appeals for its individual missions. In 2024, Ukraine was the ICRC's biggest humanitarian operation (at 196 million Swiss francs, with 167 million targeting operations in Ukraine directly).

In 2021, the top donors (>10 million Swiss Francs) to the ICRC were: the United States (544) followed by Germany (247), Switzerland (156), the United Kingdom (153), the European Commission (129), Sweden (93), Norway (87), Canada (66), Japan (51), the Netherlands (46), France (45), Australia (35), Denmark (26), Belgium (25), Ireland (18), Austria (17), Luxembourg (14), Finland (13), Spain (12), Italy (12), and New Zealand (10). The ICRC budget is becoming increasingly fragile due to its over-reliance on European and North American governments, little private contributions and little funding from BRICS countries. By way of example, in 2021, the United States provided the ICRC over 544 million Swiss Francs, while the Russian Federation provided 1 million, China 710,000, South Africa 225,106 and Brasil made no contribution.

In March 2023, the ICRC had reported a serious decline in contributions and announced cuts of CHF430 million for 2023 and 2024 with a resulting lay-off of 1,800 jobs at the headquarters and in delegations worldwide. The overall budget had almost doubled in ten years from CHF1.18 billion in 2012. According to ICRC director Robert Mardini, the reduced influx of donations was caused by the Russian invasion of Ukraine having led to crises in other parts of the world being forgotten. In May 2023, the Canton of Geneva pledged 40 million CHF in emergency donations to help the ICRC carry out its missions.

=== Responsibilities within the movement ===
The ICRC is responsible for legally recognizing a relief society as an official national Red Cross or Red Crescent society and thus accepting it into the movement. The exact rules for recognition are defined in the statutes of the movement. After recognition by the ICRC, a national society is admitted as a member to the International Federation of Red Cross and Red Crescent Societies (the Federation, or IFRC). The ICRC and the Federation cooperate with the individual national societies in their international missions, especially with human, material, and financial resources and organizing on-site logistics. According to the 1997 Seville Agreement, the ICRC is the lead Red Cross agency in conflicts while other organizations within the movement take the lead in non-war situations. National societies will be given the lead especially when a conflict is happening within their own country.

== Organization ==
The ICRC is headquartered in the Swiss city of Geneva and has external offices called Delegations (or in rare cases, "missions") in about eighty countries. Each delegation is under the responsibility of a Head of delegation who is the official representative of the ICRC in the country. Of its 3,000 professional employees, roughly 1,000 work in its Geneva headquarters and 2,000 expatriates work in the field. About half of the field workers serve as delegates managing ICRC operations, while the other half are specialists such as doctors, agronomists, engineers, or interpreters. In the delegations, the international staff are assisted by some 15,000 national employees, bringing the total staff under the authority of the ICRC to roughly 18,000. Delegations also often work closely with the National Red Cross Societies of the countries where they are based, and thus can call on the volunteers of the National Red Cross to assist in some of the ICRC's operations.

The organizational structure of the ICRC is not well understood by outsiders. This is partly because of organizational secrecy, but also because the structure itself has been prone to frequent change. The Assembly and Presidency are two long-standing institutions, but the Assembly Council and Directorate were created only in the latter part of the twentieth century. Decisions are often made in a collective way, so authority and power relationships are not set in stone. Today, the leading organs are the Directorate and the Assembly.

=== Directorate ===
The Directorate is the executive body of the ICRC. It attends to the daily management of the ICRC, whereas the Assembly sets policy. The Directorate consists of a Director-General and five directors in the areas of "Operations", "Human Resources", "Financial Resources and Logistics ", "Communication and Information Management", and "International Law and Cooperation within the Movement". The members of the Directorate are appointed by the Assembly to serve for four years. The Director-General has assumed more personal responsibility in recent years, much like a CEO, where he was formerly more of a first among equals at the Directorate.

=== Assembly ===
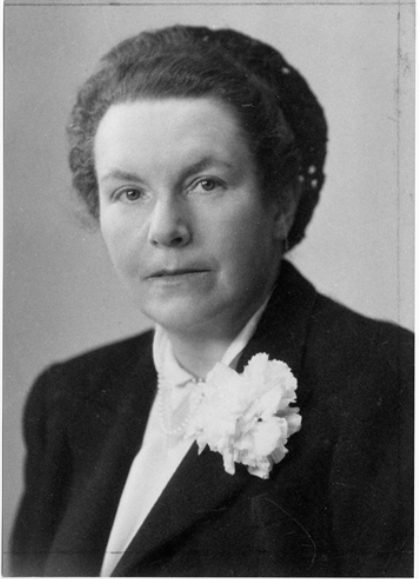
Marguerite Frick-Cramer, the first ever female member of the ICRC

The Assembly (also called the committee) convenes on a regular basis and is responsible for defining aims, guidelines, and strategies and for supervising the financial matters of the committee. The Assembly has a membership of a maximum of twenty-five Swiss citizens. Members must speak the house language of French, but some also speak English and German as well. These Assembly members are co-opted for a period of four years, and there is no limit to the number of terms an individual member can serve. A three-quarters majority vote from all members is required for re-election after the third term, which acts as a motivation for members to remain active and productive.

In the early years, every Committee member was Genevan, Protestant, white, and male. The first woman, the historian and legal scholar Renée-Marguerite Cramer (1887–1963), was co-opted in 1918, but resigned already in 1922 when she moved to Germany. She was succeeded by the nurse and suffragette Pauline Chaponnière-Chaix (1850–1934). The third female member was the music educator Suzanne Ferrière (1886–1970) in 1925, followed by the nurses Lucie Odier (1886–1984) in 1930 and Renée Bordier (1902–2000) in 1938.

In recent decades, several women have attained the Vice Presidency, and the female proportion after the Cold War has been about 15%. The first non-Genevans were admitted in 1923, and one Jew has served in the Assembly.

While the rest of the Red Cross Movement may be multi-national, the Committee believes that its mono-national nature is an asset because the nationality in question is Swiss. Thanks to permanent Swiss neutrality, conflicting parties can be sure that no one from "the enemy" will be setting policy in Geneva. The Franco-Prussian War of 1870–71 showed that even Red Cross actors (in this case National Societies) can be so bound by nationalism that they are unable to sustain neutral humanitarianism.

==== Assembly Council ====
Furthermore, the Assembly elects a five-member Assembly Council that constitutes an especially active core of the Assembly. The Council meets at least ten times per year and has the authority to decide on behalf of the full Assembly in some matters. The council is also responsible for organizing the Assembly meetings and for facilitating communication between the Assembly and the Directorate. The Assembly Council normally includes the President, two Vice presidents and two elected members. While one of the Vice presidents is elected for a four-year term, the other is appointed permanently, his tenure ending by retirement from the vice presidency or from the committee. Dr. Gilles Carbonnier is the incumbent Vice President, appointed in April 2018.

==== The President ====
The Assembly also selects, for a term of four years, one individual to act as President of the ICRC. The President is both a member of the Assembly and the leader of the ICRC, and has always been included on the Council since its formation. The President automatically becomes a member of both the Council and the Assembly, but does not necessarily come from within the ICRC. There is a strong faction within the Assembly that wants to reach outside the organization to select a President from Swiss government or professional circles (such as banking or medicine). In fact, the four most recent presidents were all previously officials for the Swiss government. The President's influence and role are not well-defined, and change depending upon the times and each President's personal style.

From 2000 to 2012, the President of the ICRC was Jakob Kellenberger, a reclusive man who rarely made diplomatic appearances, but was quite skilled in personal negotiation and comfortable with the dynamics of the Assembly. Since July 2012, the President has been Peter Maurer, a Swiss citizen who is a former Secretary for Foreign Affairs. He was appointed by the Assembly for a renewable four-year term.

Mirjana Spoljaric Egger took over the office from Peter Maurer on 1 October 2022, becoming the first woman to serve in this position.

The presidents of the ICRC have been:

- 1863–1864: Henri Dufour
- 1864–1910: Gustave Moynier
- 1910–1928: Gustave Ador
- 1928–1944: Max Huber
- 1945–1948: Carl J. Burckhardt
- 1948–1955: Paul Ruegger
- 1955–1964: Léopold Boissier
- 1964–1969: Samuel Gonard
- 1969–1973: Marcel Naville
- 1973–1976: Eric Martin
- 1976–1987: Alexandre Hay
- 1987–1999: Cornelio Sommaruga
- 2000–2012: Jakob Kellenberger
- 2012–2022: Peter Maurer
- 2022–present: Mirjana Spoljaric Egger
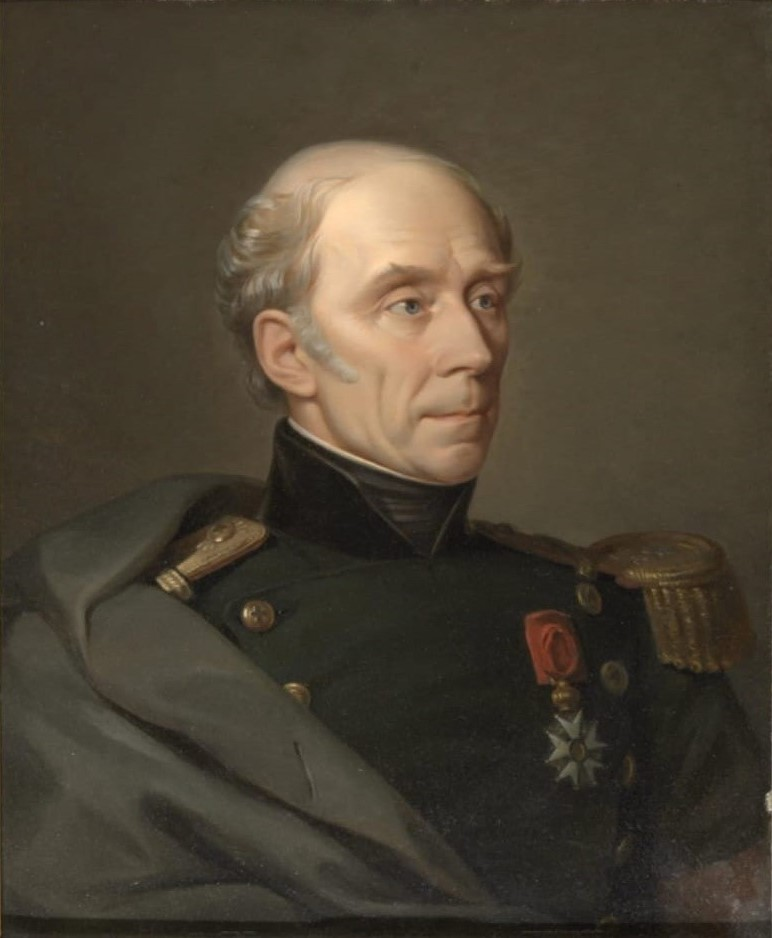
Henri Dufour,
(1787–1875)

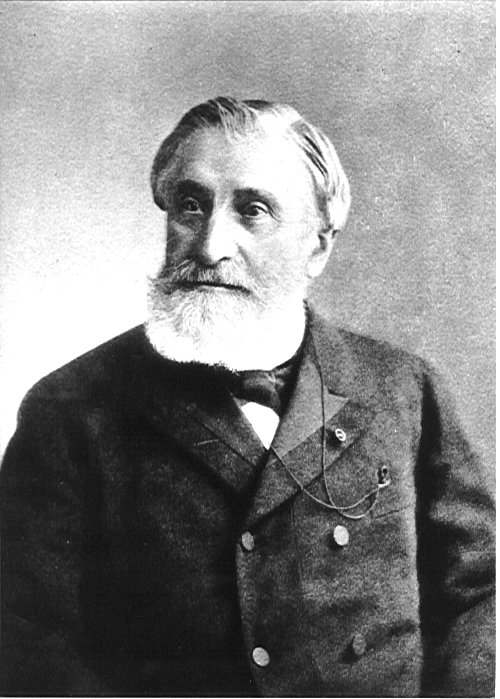
Gustave Moynier,
(1826–1910)

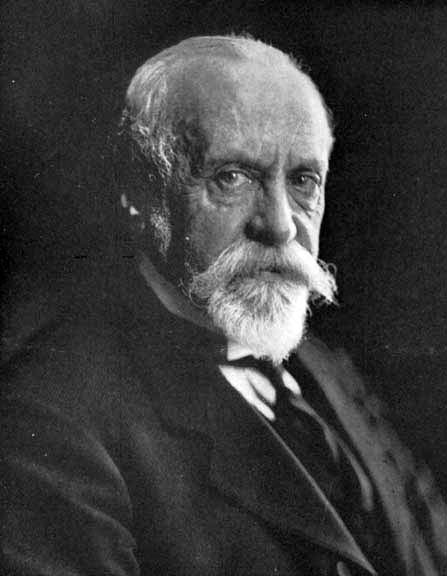
Gustave Ador,
(1845–1928)

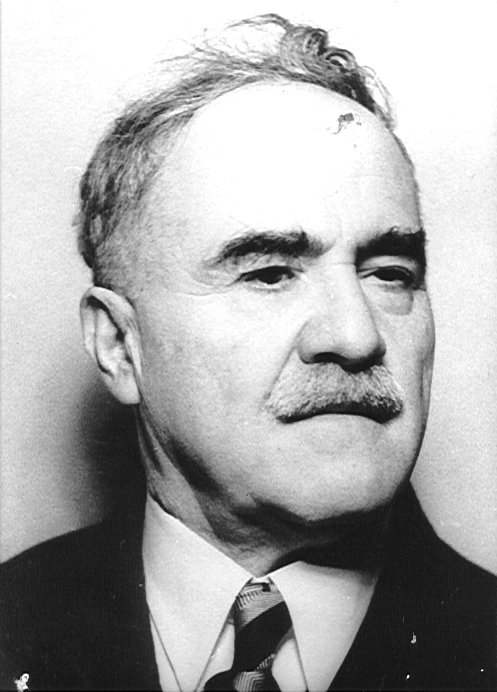
Max Huber,
(1874–1960)

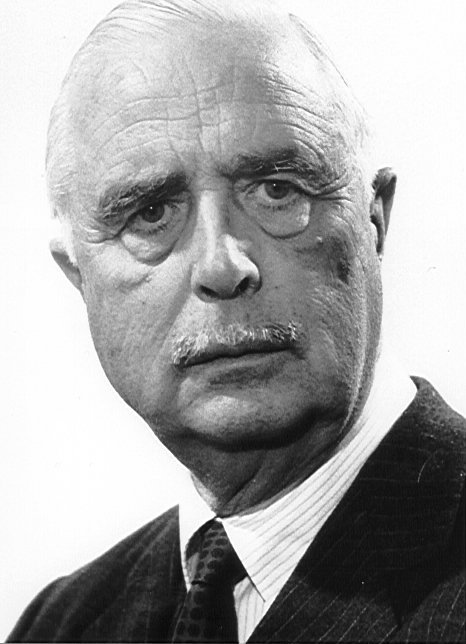
Carl Burckhardt,
(1891–1974)

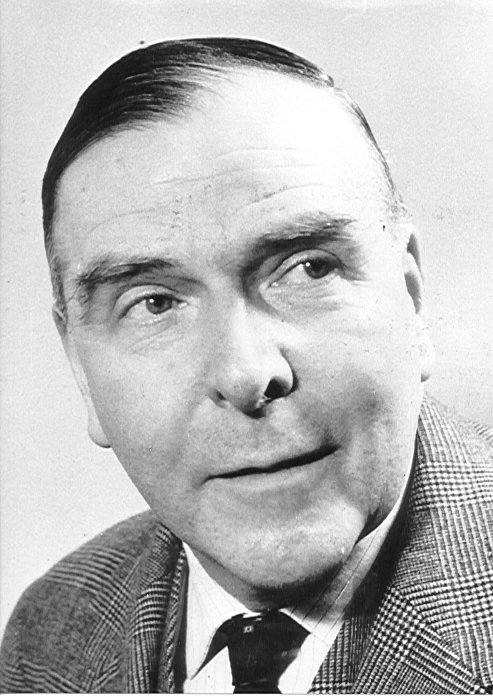
Paul Ruegger,
(1897–1988)

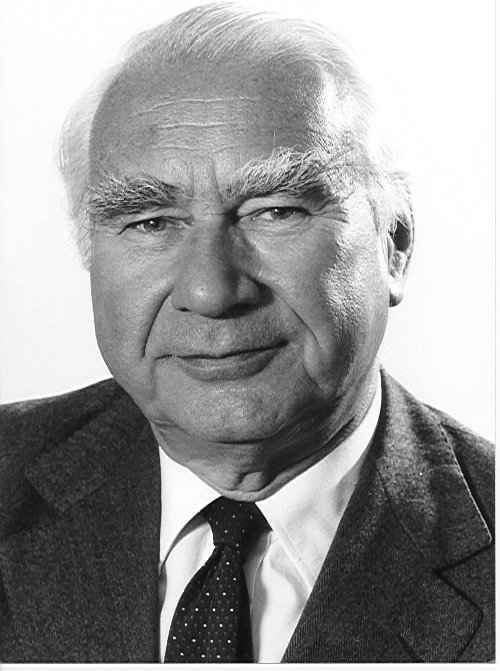
Alexandre Hay,
(1919–1991)

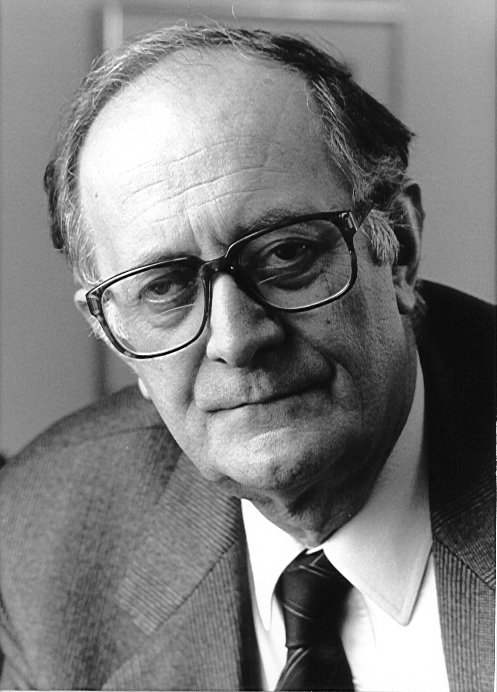
Cornelio Sommaruga,
(1932–2024)

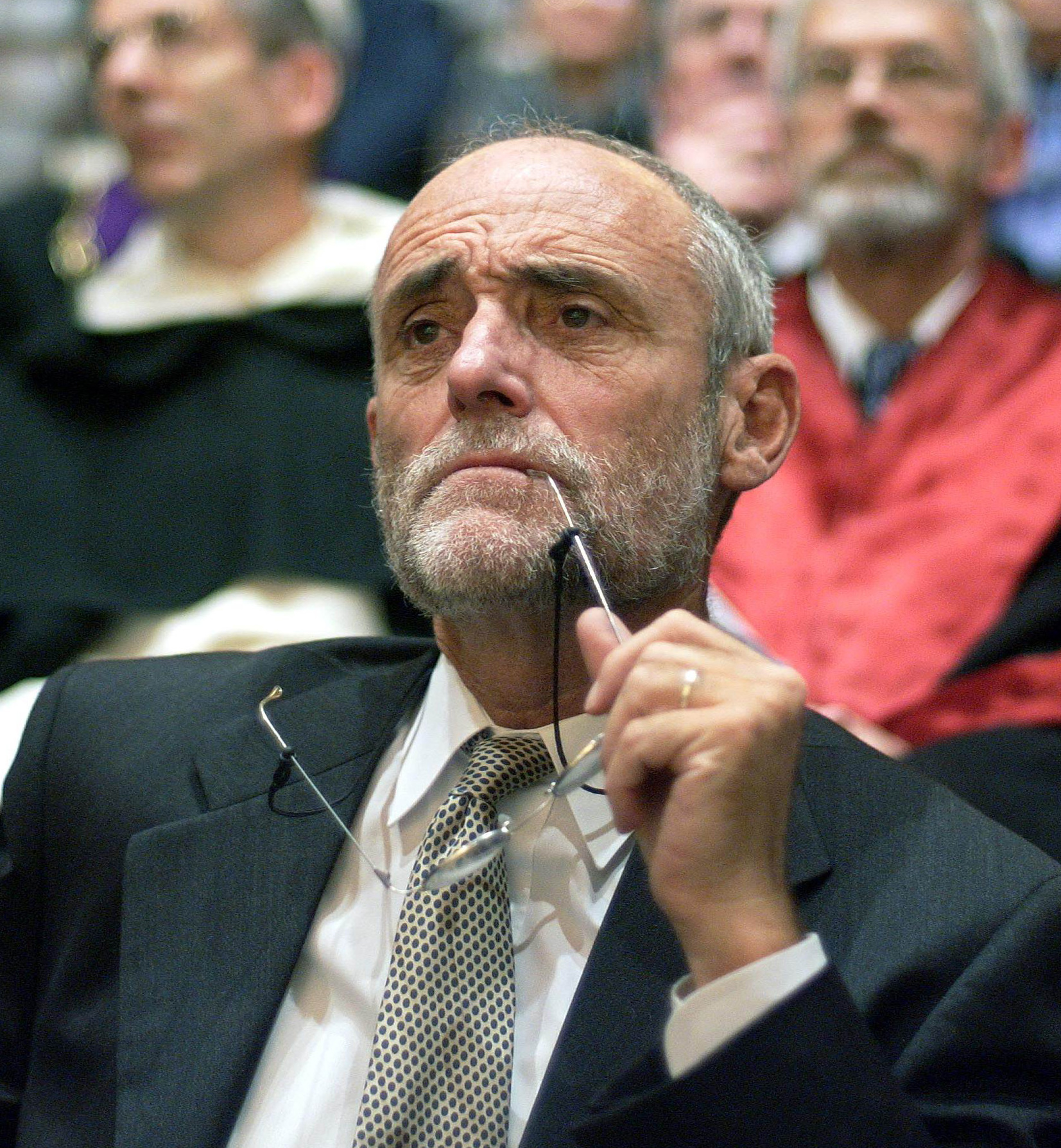
Jakob Kellenberger,
(1944–)

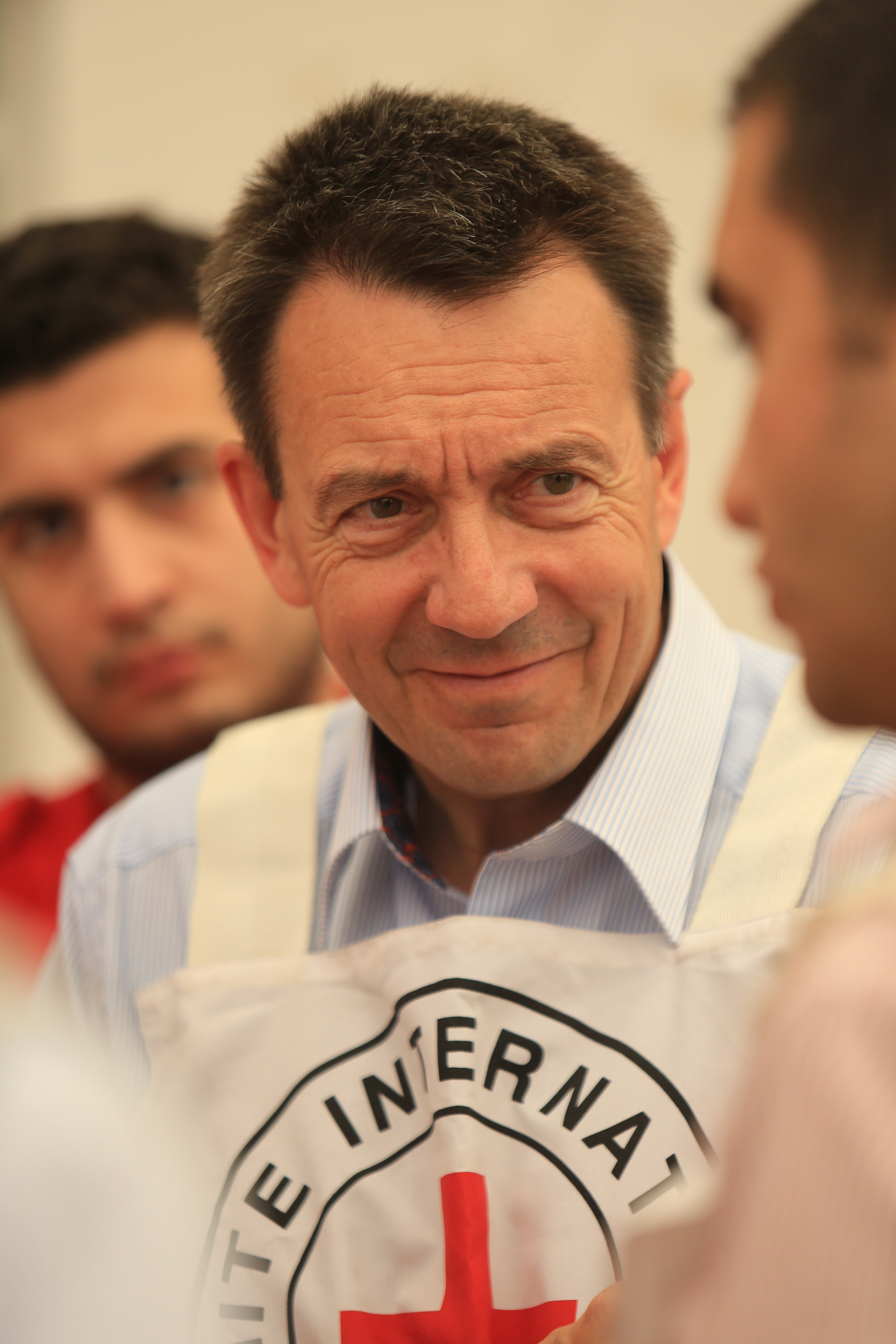
Peter Maurer,
(1956–)

=== Staff ===
As the ICRC has grown and become more directly involved in conflicts, it has seen an increase in professional staff rather than volunteers over the years. The ICRC had only twelve employees in 1914 and 1,900 in the Second World War complemented its 1,800 volunteers. The number of paid staff dropped off after both wars, but has increased once again in the last few decades, averaging 500 field staff in the 1980s and over a thousand in the 1990s. Beginning in the 1970s, the ICRC became more systematic in training to develop a more professional staff. The ICRC offers attractive careers for university graduates, especially in Switzerland, but the workload as an ICRC employee is demanding. 15% of the staff leaves each year and 75% of employees stay less than three years. The ICRC staff is multi-national and averaged about 50% non-Swiss citizens in 2004. The ICRC's international staff are assisted in their work by some 15,000 national employees hired in the countries where the delegations are based.

=== The ICRC worldwide ===
The ICRC operates in over 80 countries with a total number of 18,000 employed people worldwide. The extensive network of ICRC missions and delegations can help to relieve nations affected by conflict and violence. Over the past few years, the ICRC's largest operations have typically been in Yemen, Syria, the Democratic Republic of the Congo, South Sudan, Iraq and more recently, Ethiopia.

=== The ICRC Library ===
The International Committee Red Cross Library has been founded in 1863 the same year than the institution. This Library is opened to the internal staff at the headquarters and on the field but also but also to the external public. The collection contains in particular and International humanitarian law (IHL) documents.

== Relationships within the movement ==

By virtue of its age and its special position under international humanitarian law, the ICRC is the lead agency in the Red Cross Movement, but it has weathered some power struggles within the movement. The ICRC has come into conflict with the Federation and certain national societies at various times. The American Red Cross threatened to supplant the ICRC with its creation of the International Federation of Red Cross and Red Crescent Societies as "a real international Red Cross" after the First World War. Elements of the Swedish Red Cross desired to supplant the Swiss authority of the ICRC after WWII. Over time the Swedish sentiments subsided, and the IFRC grew to work more harmoniously with the ICRC after years of organizational discord. Currently, the IFRC's Movement Cooperation division organizes interaction and cooperation with the ICRC.

In 1997, the ICRC and the IFRC signed the Seville Agreement which further defined the responsibilities of both organizations within the movement. According to the agreement, the Federation is the lead agency of the movement in any emergency situation which does not take place as part of an armed conflict.

=== Acceptance of Magen David Adom ===
From its inception in 1930 until 2006, the Magen David Adom organization, the Israeli equivalent to the Red Cross, was not accepted as part of the Federation, as it used the Star of David, which the ICRC refused to accept as a protective symbol due to its ostensibly religious symbolism in a country marred by ethno-religious conflicts. This meant that although ambulances operated by Red Crescent societies were protected by the Geneva Conventions, those displaying the Star of David were not. In protest over the ICRC's stance, the American Red Cross withdrew its financial support. In 2005, at a meeting of nations party to the Geneva Conventions, the ICRC adopted a new symbol called Red Crystal. Magen David Adom then reworked their symbol by placing the Star of David sign inside the Red Crystal shape, following which it was accepted as a full member of the Movement in 2006.

== International relationships ==
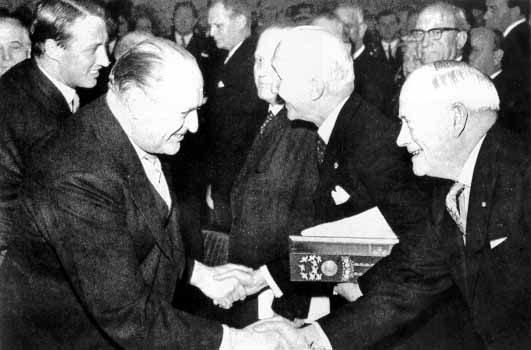
The Nobel Peace Prize ceremony in 1963 when the prize was jointly awarded to the ICRC and the Federation. From left to right: King Olav of Norway, ICRC President Leopold Boissier, League chairman John MacAulay.

The ICRC prefers to engage states directly and relies on low-key and confidential negotiations to lobby for access to prisoners of war and improvement in their treatment. Its findings are not available to the general public but are shared only with the relevant government. This is in contrast to related organizations like Doctors Without Borders and Amnesty International who are more willing to expose abuses and apply public pressure to governments. The ICRC reasons that this approach allows it greater access and cooperation from governments in the long run.

When granted only partial access, the ICRC takes what it can get and keeps discreetly lobbying for greater access. In the era of apartheid South Africa, it was granted access to prisoners like Nelson Mandela serving sentences, but not to those under interrogation and awaiting trial. After his release, Mandela publicly praised the Red Cross.

The presence of respectable aid organizations can make weak regimes appear more legitimate, according to Fiona Terry, head of ICRC's operational research centre. Terry contends that "this is particularly true of [the] ICRC, whose mandate, reputation, and discretion imbue its presence with a particularly affirming quality." Recognizing this power, the ICRC can pressure weak governments to change their behaviour by threatening to withdraw. As mentioned above, Nelson Mandela acknowledged that the ICRC compelled better treatment of prisoners and had leverage over his South African captors because "avoiding international condemnation was the authorities' main goal."

== People who have worked for the ICRC ==
- Louis Appia (1818–1898), co-founder
- Orianne Aymard (1978), author, lecturer and himalayist
- Laurence Boissier (1965–2022), writer
- Friedrich Born (1903–1963), diplomat
- Carl Jacob Burckhardt (1891– 1974), diplomat, historian and writer
- Pierre Cormon (1965), journalist and writer
- Patricia Danzi senior civil servant
- Henry Dunant (1828–1910), founder
- Marguerite Frick-Cramer (1887–1963), historian
- Alfonso Gomez (1960), politician
- Max Huber (1874–1960), jurist, president of the ICRC
- Marcel Junod (1904–1961), physician
- Jakob Kellenberger (1944), diplomat, president of the ICRC
- Daniel Koch (1955), physician and senior civil servant
- Pierre Krähenbühl (1966), Director General
- Philippe Lazzarini (1964), Commissioner-General of the UNRWA
- Théodore Maunoir (1806–1869), surgeon, co-founder of the ICRC
- Peter Maurer (1956), historian, specialist in International Humanitarian Law, president of the ICRC
- Gustave Moynier (1826–1910), jurist, co-founder of the ICRC
- Jean Pictet (1914–2002), Doctor of Law
- Cornelio Sommaruga (1932–2024), diplomat, president of the ICRC
- Mirjana Spoljaric Egger (1971), diplomat, president of the ICRC

== Bibliography ==
=== Books ===
- Forsythe, David P. and B. Rieffer-Flanagan. The International Committee of the Red Cross- A Neutral Humanitarian Actor (Routledge, 2007)
- Forsythe, David P. The Humanitarians. The International Committee of the Red Cross. (2nd ed. Cambridge UP, 2005), ISBN 0-521-61281-0
- Dunant, Henry. A Memory of Solferino. ICRC, Geneva 1986, ISBN 2-88145-006-7
- Haug, Hans. Humanity for all: the International Red Cross and Red Crescent Movement. Henry Dunant Institute, Geneva in association with Paul Haupt Publishers, Bern 1993, ISBN 3-258-04719-7
- Willemin, Georges and Roger Heacock: International Organization and the Evolution of World Society. Volume 2: The International Committee of the Red Cross. Martinus Nijhoff Publishers, Boston 1984, ISBN 90-247-3064-3
- Pierre Boissier: History of the International Committee of the Red Cross. Volume I: From Solferino to Tsushima. Henry Dunant Institute, Geneva 1985, ISBN 2-88044-012-2
- André Durand: History of the International Committee of the Red Cross. Volume II: From Sarajevo to Hiroshima. Henry Dunant Institute, Geneva 1984, ISBN 2-88044-009-2
- International Committee of the Red Cross: Handbook of the International Red Cross and Red Crescent Movement. 13th edition, ICRC, Geneva 1994, ISBN 2-88145-074-1
- Hutchinson, John F. Champions of Charity: War and the Rise of the Red Cross. Westview Press, Boulder 1997, ISBN 0-8133-3367-9
- Moorehead, Caroline. Dunant's dream: War, Switzerland and the history of the Red Cross. HarperCollins, London 1998, ISBN 0-00-255141-1 (Hardcover edition); HarperCollins, London 1999, ISBN 0-00-638883-3 (Paperback edition)
- François Bugnion: The International Committee of the Red Cross and the protection of war victims. ICRC & Macmillan (ref. 0503), Geneva 2003, ISBN 0-333-74771-2
- Angela Bennett: The Geneva Convention: The Hidden Origins of the Red Cross. Sutton Publishing, Gloucestershire 2005, ISBN 0-7509-4147-2
- Favez, Jean-Claude (1999). The Red Cross and the Holocaust. Cambridge, UK: Cambridge University Press. ISBN 978-0-521-41587-3.
- Dominique-D. Junod : "The Imperiled Red Cross and the Palestine Eretz Yisrael Conflict: The Influence of Institutional Concerns on A Humanitarian Operation." 344 pages. Kegan Paul International. @ The Graduate Institute of International Studies Geneva. ISBN 0-7103-0519-2, 1995.
- Dromi, Shai M. Above the Fray: The Red Cross and the Making of the Humanitarian NGO Sector (Univ. of Chicago Press, 2020) ISBN 9780226680248.

=== Articles ===
- François Bugnion: The emblem of the Red Cross: a brief history. ICRC (ref. 0316), Geneva 1977
- Jean-Philippe Lavoyer, Louis Maresca: The Role of the ICRC in the Development of International Humanitarian Law. In: International Negotiation. 4(3)/1999. Brill Academic Publishers, p. 503–527, ISSN 1382-340X
- Neville Wylie: The Sound of Silence: The History of the International Committee of the Red Cross as Past and Present. In: Diplomacy and Statecraft. 13(4)/2002. Routledge/ Taylor & Francis, p. 186–204, ISSN 0959-2296
- David P. Forsythe: "The International Committee of the Red Cross and International Humanitarian Law." In: Humanitäres Völkerrecht – Informationsschriften. The Journal of International Law of Peace and Armed Conflict. 2/2003, German Red Cross and Institute for International Law of Peace and Armed Conflict, p. 64–77, ISSN 0937-5414
- François Bugnion: Towards a comprehensive Solution to the Question of the Emblem. Revised third edition. ICRC (ref. 0778), Geneva 2005
- International Committee of the Red Cross: "Discover the ICRC", ICRC, Geneva, 2007, 2nd edition, 53 pp. Archived 29 April 2010 at the Wayback Machine
- International Review of the Red Cross Archived 23 June 2024 at the Wayback Machine An unrivalled source of international research, analysis and debate on all aspects of humanitarian law, in armed conflict and other situations of collective violence.
