= Louis Appia =

Swiss surgeon

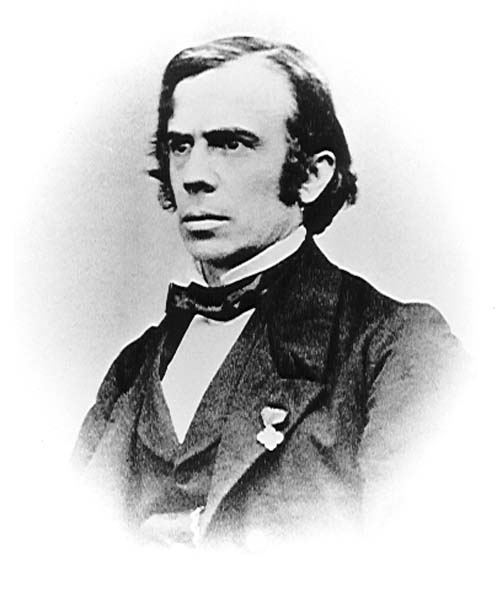
Louis Appia

Louis Paul Amédée Appia (13 October 1818 – 1 May 1898) was a Swiss surgeon with special merit in the area of military medicine. In 1863 he became a member of the Geneva "Committee of Five", which was the precursor to the International Committee of the Red Cross. Six years later he met Clara Barton, an encounter which had significant influence on Clara Barton's subsequent endeavours to found a Red Cross society in the United States and her campaign for an accession of the US to the Geneva Convention of 1864.

== Education and career as a field surgeon ==
Appie was born in Hanau and baptised Louis Paul Amadeus Appia. Appia's parents, Paul Joseph Appia and Caroline Develey, originally came from Piedmont. His father, who had been a University student in Geneva, nevertheless became an evangelical pastor in 1811 in Hanau near Frankfurt am Main. Louis was the third of six children. He went to Gymnasium (high school) in Frankfurt and at eighteen gained the Hochschulreife diploma in Geneva. In 1838 he began to study medicine in Heidelberg and concluded his medical doctorate in 1843, after which he returned to Frankfurt.

In 1848, he assisted the wounded in Paris and Frankfurt during the February revolution in France and the March revolution in the German states. Afterwards, his specialty and focus became the improvement of the application of medicine to the war-wounded. After the death of his father in 1849, he traveled with his mother to Geneva and began to practice as a surgeon. In connection with his work on military medicine, he developed an instrument to immobilize a broken arm or leg during the transport of a wounded individual. He also wrote a treatise about surgical treatment for the war-wounded. In 1853, he married Anne Caroline Lassere and during their marriage had two sons (Paul and Adolphe) and two daughters (Helene and Marie). His son Adolphe Appia became an architect and was a pioneer of modern stage design.

In 1859 his brother George, who was a pastor in Pinerolo, sent him several letters regarding the situation for the wounded and victims of the Austro-Sardinian War. In July, Appia traveled to Italy and ended up working in field hospitals in Turin, Milan, Brescia and Desenzano del Garda. He distributed copies of his treatise to the Italian and French doctors, organized the collection of necessary materials, and sent letters to his friends in Geneva requesting the donation of funds to assist the wounded. At the Saint Phillippe Hospital in Milan his invention for transporting patients with broken bones was successfully tested on a wounded lieutenant.

At the beginning of August, he returned to Geneva. Here he completed his treatise with the assistance of his friend Dr. Théodore Maunoir and published it as a book with the title "The Ambulance Surgeon; or, Practical Observations on Gunshot Wounds" (Der Feldchirurg oder einige praktische Studien über Schußverletzungen). He was also awarded the "Medal of the Saints Maurice and Lazarus", the second-highest decoration of the Kingdom of Italy, for his medical work during the Austro-Sardinian War. In November 1860, he gained the Geneva citizenship right and became a member of the Geneva Medical Society a year later.

== Activity with the ICRC ==
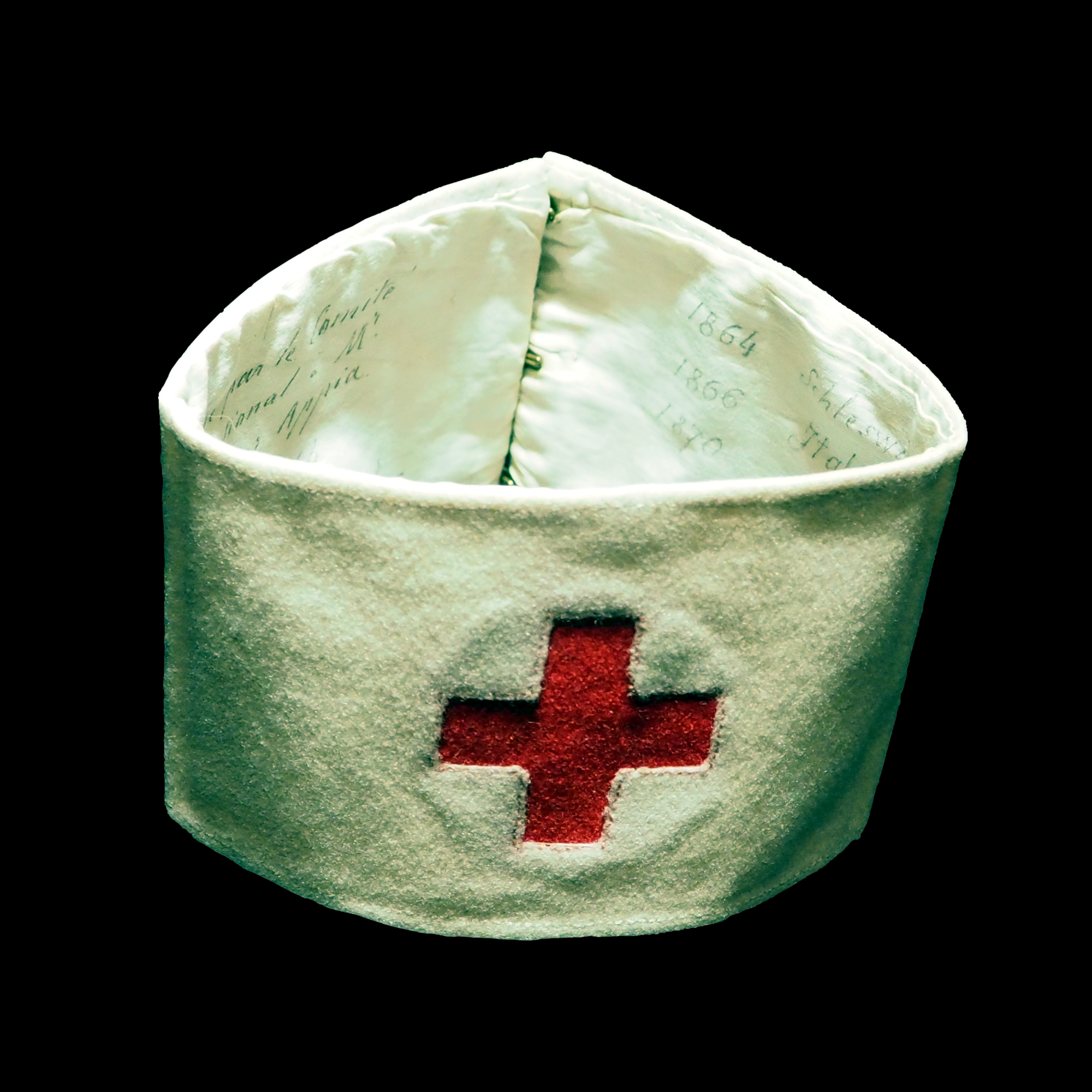
Armband worn by Louis Appia on several battlefields, 1864, with dates and places written on the inside. On display at International Red Cross and Red Crescent Museum.

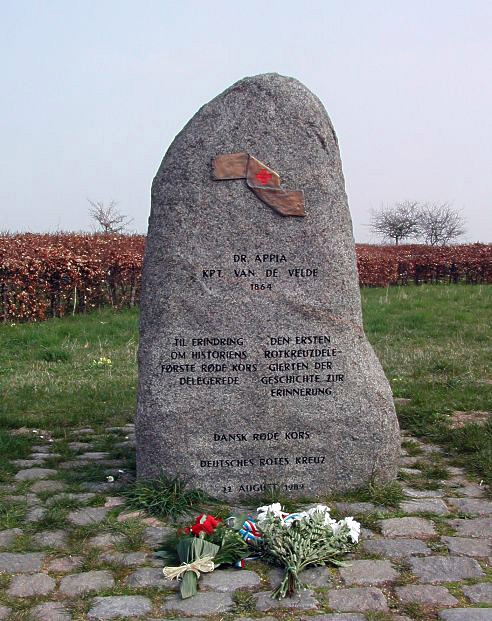
Memorial commemorating the first use of the Red Cross symbol in an armed conflict by Louis Appia and Charles Van de Velde

In 1863, Appia was requested to join the "Committee of Five" in order to examine the ideas of Henry Dunant and work towards their possible implementation. He therefore became one of the five founding members of the "International Committee for Relief to Wounded Soldiers" that in 1876 was renamed the "International Committee of the Red Cross" (ICRC). In October 1863, Appia suggested that all volunteers should wear white armbands on the battlefield to designate their status. General Henri Dufour later expanded this recommendation by placing a red cross on the band. A red cross on a white background, the inverse of the Swiss flag, became the symbol of the Committee. During the Second War of Schleswig (Danish-Prussian war) at the Battle of Dybbøl (Battle at the Düppeler Schanzen), Appia and the Dutch Captain Charles Van de Velde became the first delegates in history to wear these armbands as neutral observers of an ongoing battle and the attendant provision of care. Two years later, in June 1866, he became reengaged in the Italian unification struggle after a request by his brother. Together with two other volunteers, the two treated wounded in Storo, a small town in Italy.

In 1867, Appia took over the position of Secretary when Henry Dunant dropped out of the International Committee. Because of the broad role of President Gustave Moynier, this position had neither significant power nor was it a substantial burden. During this period, the Committee met about three to four times a month in his house. In August 1869, he met Clara Barton, who was in Switzerland for a long medical rest. Impressed by her activities during the American Civil War, he asked her why the United States had refused to sign the Geneva Convention. For Barton, who had not heard of the ideas of Henry Dunant, this conversation became crucial in prompting her efforts after her return towards the founding of the American Red Cross and the US accession to the Geneva Convention.

During the Franco-Prussian War (1870–1871), Appia was again active as a deployed delegate. Also, in October 1872, he gave on the site assistance in Egypt to help in the creation of the first non-European Red Cross society. He also supported Clara Barton's idea to expand the mission of the Red Cross societies to deal with the victim of natural disasters and epidemics. In the following years, he continued his studies on battle injuries and remained an active member of the ICRC until his death.

== Bibliography ==
- Originally translated from the German Wikipedia
- Pierre Boissier: History of the International Committee of the Red Cross. Volume I: From Solferino to Tsushima. Henry Dunant Institute, Geneva 1985, ISBN 2-88044-012-2
- Caroline Moorehead: Dunant's dream: War, Switzerland and the history of the Red Cross. HarperCollins, London 1998, ISBN 0-00-255141-1 (Hardback Edition); HarperCollins, London 1999, ISBN 0-00-638883-3 (Paperback Edition)
- Roger Boppe: L'homme et la guerre. Le Docteur Louis Appia et les débuts de la Croix-Rouge. Muhlethaler, Geneva 1959
