= Guillaume Henri Dufour =

Swiss soldier, engineer, and topographer (1787–1875)

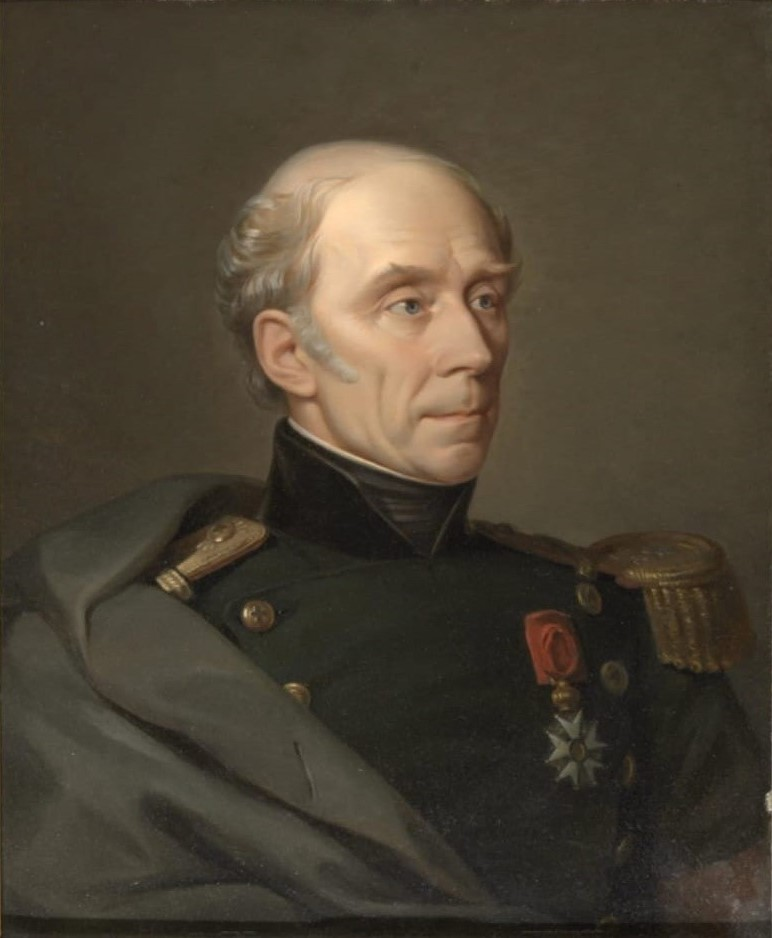
- Portrait of Dufour by his daughter Anne Octavie L'Hardy Dufour (1818–1891), after 1840
- Born: 15 September 1787; Konstanz, Holy Roman Empire (now Germany)
- Died: 14 July 1875 (aged 87); Geneva, Switzerland
- Military career
- Allegiance: France (1811–1817); Switzerland (1817–1875)
- Branch: French Army; Swiss Army
- Service years: 1811–1875
- Rank: Captain (France); General (Switzerland)
- Commands: Swiss Army; Federal Office of Topography
- Conflicts: Napoleonic Wars; Sonderbund War
- Awards: Légion d'Honneur
- Other work: Professor of mathematics, cartographer, founding committee of the International Red Cross

Signature
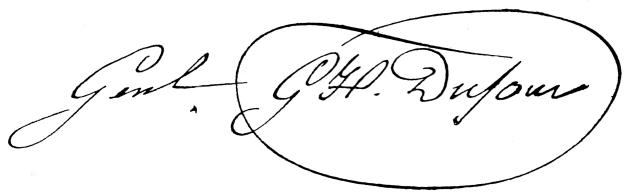

Guillaume Henri Dufour (French pronunciation: [ɡijom ɑ̃ʁi dyfuʁ]; 15 September 1787 – 14 July 1875) was a Swiss military officer, structural engineer and topographer. He served under Napoleon I and held the Swiss office of General four times in his career, firstly in 1847 when he led the Swiss Confederation forces to victory against the Sonderbund. In 1864 Dufour presided over the First Geneva Convention which established the International Red Cross. He was founder and president (1838 to 1865) of the Swiss Federal Office of Topography.

== Early life ==
Dufour was born on 15 September 1787 in Konstanz, where his parents from Geneva were living in exile for their involvement in the Revolution of 1782. He was the son of Bénédict Dufour, a watchmaker, and Pernette Valentin. When he was two years old, his parents were allowed to return to Geneva, where Dufour attended school and studied drawing and medicine. In 1807, Dufour travelled to Paris to join the École Polytechnique, then a military academy. He studied descriptive geometry under Jean Nicolas Pierre Hachette, and graduated fifth in his class in 1809, going on to study military engineering at the École d'Application in Metz.

== Career ==
In 1811, Dufour joined the French Army and was sent to help defend Corfu, in the French Ionian Islands, where he mapped the island's old fortifications. He was wounded in action in June 1813 during a naval battle against the British. By 1814, he had attained the rank of captain, and was awarded the Cross of the Légion d'Honneur for his work repairing fortifications at Lyon. In 1817, he resumed his status as a Swiss citizen, and returned to Geneva to become commander of the Canton of Geneva's military engineers, as well as a professor of mathematics at the Academy of Geneva. From 1819 to 1830 he was chief instructor in the military school of Thun, which had been founded mainly through his efforts. Among other distinguished foreign pupils he instructed Louis-Napoleon Bonaparte, nephew of the former Emperor.

In 1827 he was raised to the rank of colonel, and commanded the Federal army in a series of field manoeuvres. In 1831 he became chief of the staff, and soon afterwards he was appointed quartermaster-general. Two years later the Federal Diet commissioned him to superintend the execution of a complete trigonometrical survey of Switzerland. He had already made a cadastral survey of the canton of Geneva, and published a map of the canton on the scale of 1/25000. The Topographic Map of Switzerland in 25 sheets on the scale of 1/100000 was published at intervals between 1842 and 1865.

In 1847 the Catholic cantons of Switzerland attempted to form a separate alliance of their own, known as the Sonderbund, effectively splitting from the rest of the country. The Federal Diet appointed Dufour General on 21 October 1847, and he led the federal army of 100,000 and defeated the Sonderbund under Johann-Ulrich von Salis-Soglio in a campaign that lasted only from 3 to 29 November, and claimed fewer than a hundred victims. He ordered his troops to spare the injured. For example, on November 13, 1847, when everything was ready for the offensive, he sent Lieutenant de Cerjat as an emissary to the authorities of the city of Fribourg enjoining them to surrender in order to avoid a deadly battle. With his mindful approach in the Sonderbund War, Dufour not only prevented a collapse of the Confederation through intervention by foreign powers, but he also created a basis of reconciliation that enabled the cantons to agree on a common federal state already in 1848. His success, and the moderation with which he treated his vanquished fellow-countrymen, were acknowledged by a gift of 60,000 francs from the Federal Diet and various honours from different cities and cantons of the confederation.

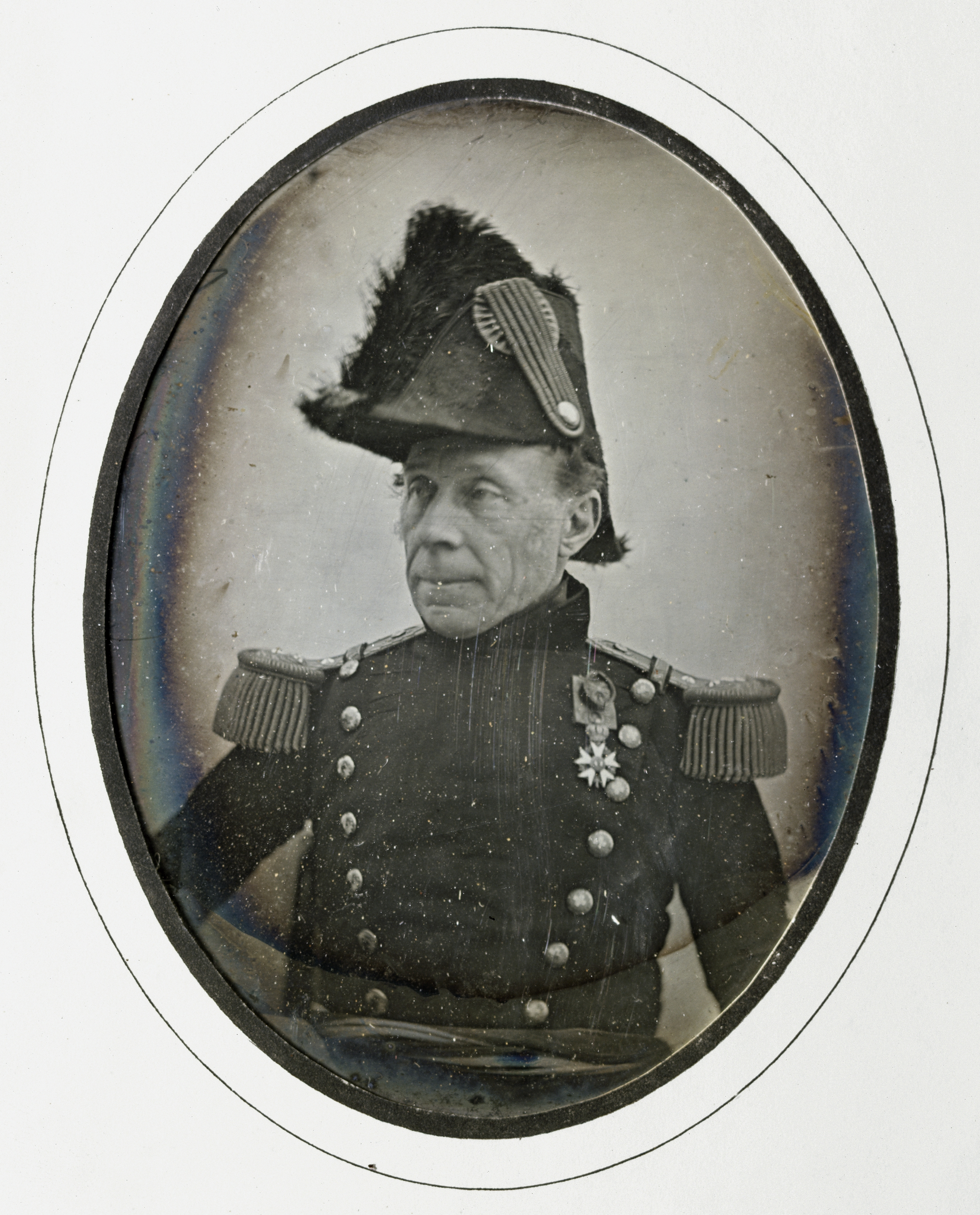
Daguerreotype of general G.H. Dufour, c. 1848

In addition to serving in the position of General in 1847 due to the Sonderbund War, the Federal Assembly appointed him to the same position in August 1849 due to the Baden Revolution, on 27 December 1856 due to the Neuchâtel Crisis, and in 1859 due to the Second Italian War of Independence.

In 1850 the mountaineer and topographer Johann Coaz served as his private secretary.

From 1861, he was the honorary president of the Swiss Geodetic Commission a commission of the Swiss Academy of Natural Sciences. This commission was created during the publication of the Dufour map, and its initial work contributed to the design of the Topographic Atlas of Switzerland. In 1861, Johan Jacob Baeyer proposed the creation of the Central European Arc Measurement, whose objective was to redetermine anomalies in the shape of the Earth using precise geodetic surveys combined with gravimetry. The aim was to figure out the geoid using gravimetric and leveling measurements to derive an accurate understanding of the Earth ellipsoid while taking vertical deflections into account.

In 1863 he was part of a committee with Gustave Moynier, Henry Dunant, Louis Appia and Théodore Maunoir that discussed Dunant's ideas for the creation of a voluntary care organization for the assistance of the wounded in battle. Dunant's vision and the committees work ultimately led to the foundation of the International Red Cross, presided by Dufour. The following year he presided over the international conference which framed the First Geneva Convention as to the treatment of the wounded in time of war.

On 16 July 1875, 60,000 persons participated at Dufour's burial at Cimetière de Plainpalais in Geneva.

== Saint Antoine Bridge ==
Saint Antoine Bridge as pictured by Drewry, 1832

Dufour acted as state engineer from 1817, although he was not officially appointed as such until 1828. His work included rebuilding a pumping station, quays and bridges, and he arranged the first steam boat on Lake Geneva as well as the introduction of gas streetlights.

The scientist Marc-Auguste Pictet had visited Marc Seguin's temporary wire-cable simple suspension bridge at Annonay in 1822, the first wire-cable bridge in the world, and published details in Switzerland. He joined with others to promote a new bridge across the Genevan fortifications, consulting with Seguin on how it might be built, receiving back a series of sketches. Dufour developed the design in late 1822, proposing a two-span suspension bridge using wire cables — this would become the first permanent wire cable suspension bridge in the world. The design used three cables on each side of an iron and timber bridge deck. The cables stretched 131 feet between the towers, although the largest span was only 109 feet.

== Memorials ==
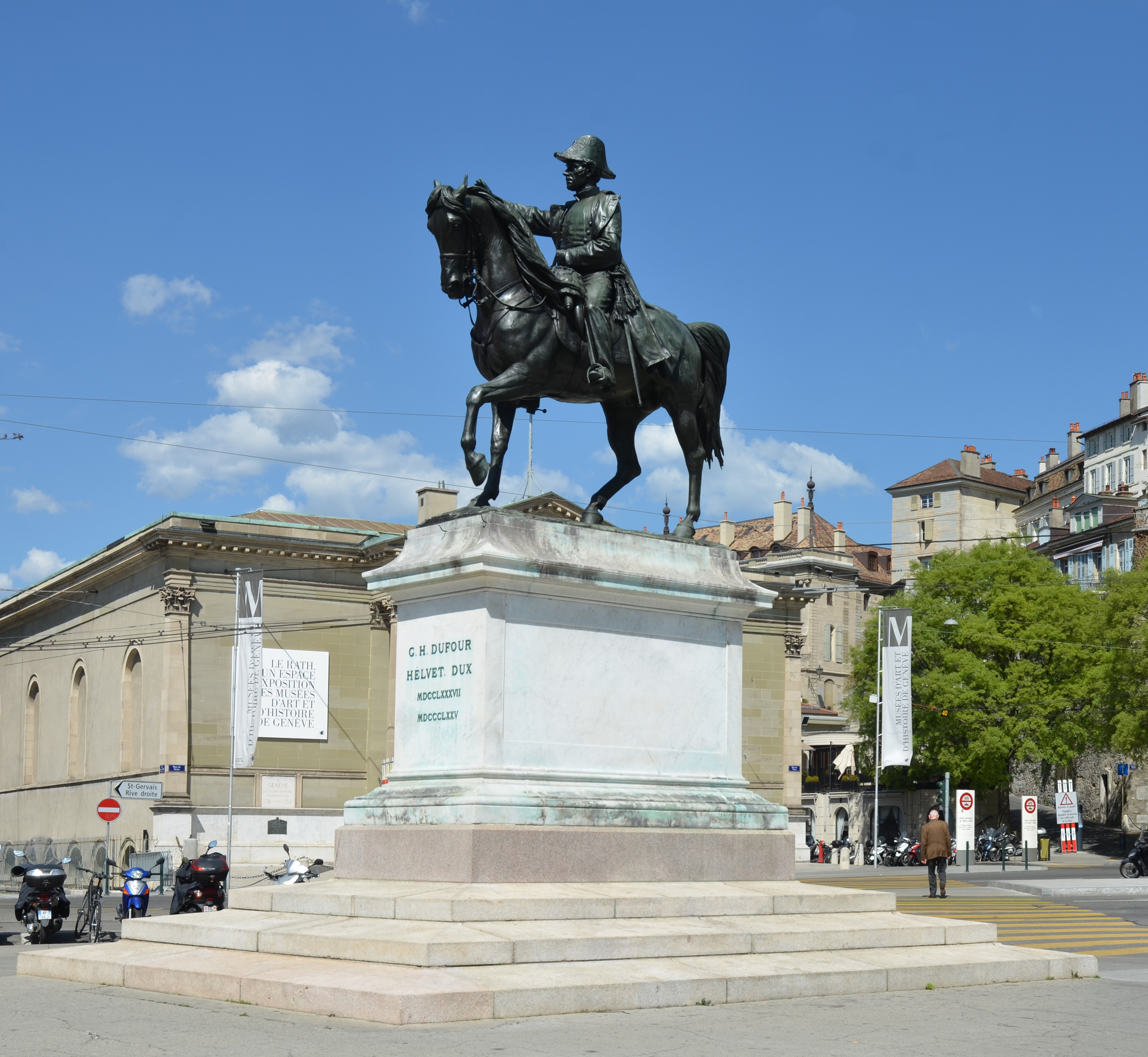
Equestrian statue (1884) by Alfred Lanz, at Place Neuve, Geneva

Memorials are at:

- Equestrian statue (1884) by Alfred Lanz, at Place Neuve, Geneva, erected by public subscription
- Two plaques on his birth house at Wessenbergstraße 14 (formerly Plattengasse), Konstanz, Germany
- Plaque at the building where he lived from 1826 to 1845 at Geneva
- Plaque at Château de Montrottier in Lovagny, France
- Plaque at 22, rue Saint-Victor, Carouge, commemorating its use as office of topography.
- Bronze bust, made by Fonderie Leuba, B. Brasseur, succ. at Army Training Center, Lucerne

His home from 1845–1875 at Rue de Contamines, Geneva, is preserved by a foundation.

Numerous cities and towns in Switzerland have streets named for him: rue du Général-Dufour in Geneva, La Chaux-de-Fonds; via Gen. Henri Dufour in Chiasso; rue du Général- Dufour/General-Dufour-Strasse in Biel/Bienne; Dufourstrasse in Aarau, Basel, Bern, Biberist, Lenzburg, Luzern, Rorschach, St. Gallen, Thun, Weinfelden, Wettingen, Wil, Zollikon, Zürich; via Dufour in Lugano. There is also Dufourplatz in Zollikon.

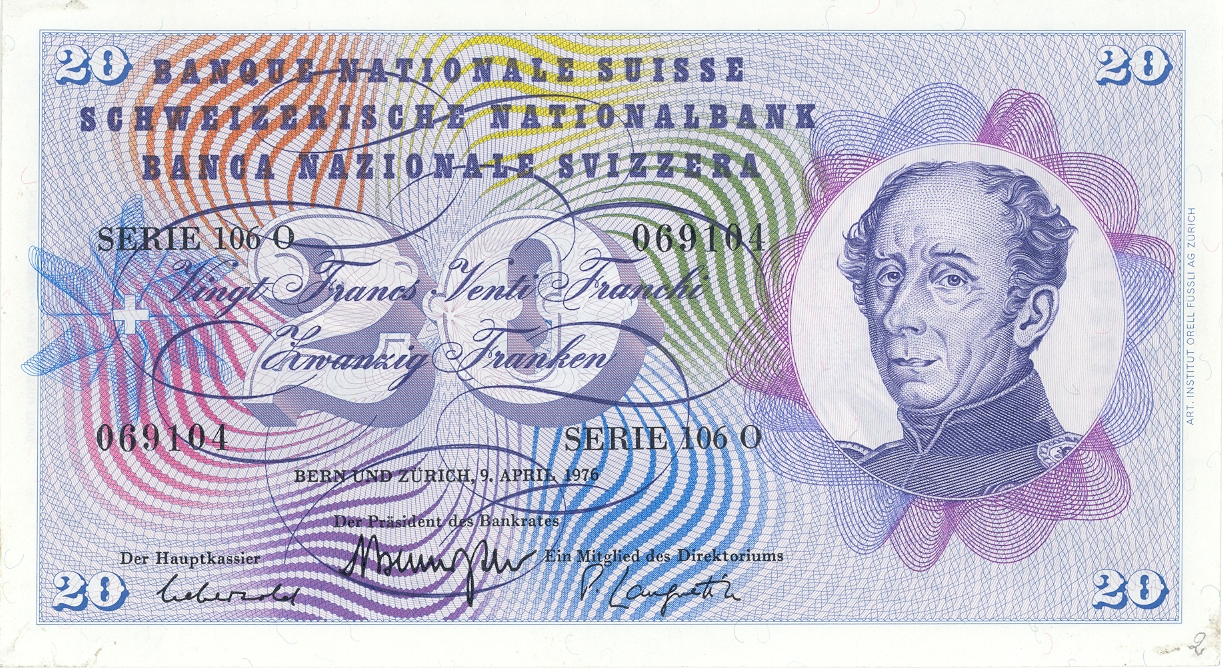
20 francs note (1956)

The general was depicted on the 20 francs note of the 1956 series of Swiss banknotes (in circulation 1956–1980).

The Dufourspitze (the highest mountain peak in Switzerland and second of Western Europe) in the Monte Rosa Massif is named after Dufour, to honour his cartographic achievements.

== See also ==
- Plainpalais
