= Seville Agreement =

Agreement made by two Red Cross entities

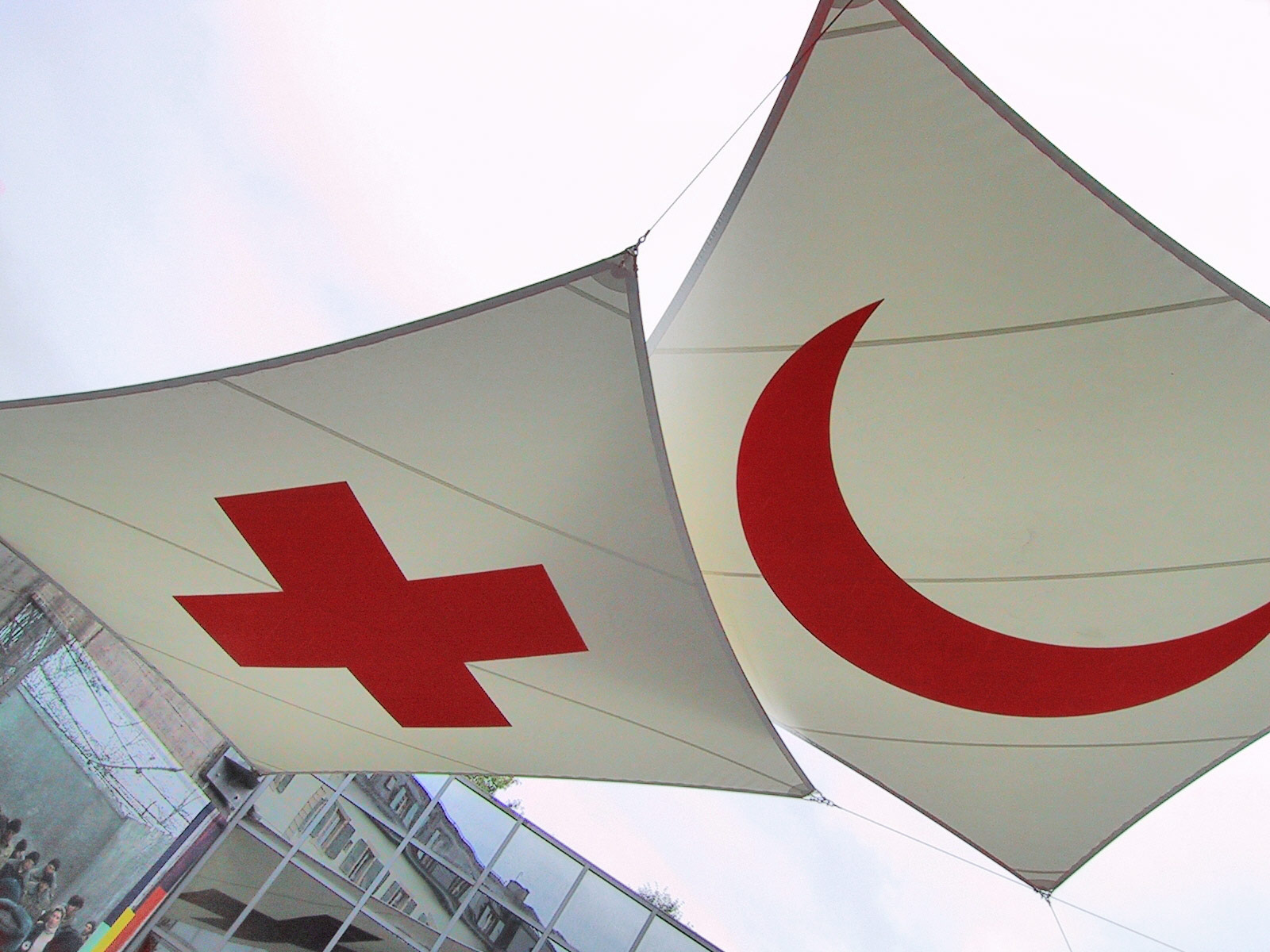
Red Cross and Red Crescent logos

The Seville Agreement is an agreement drafted by the International Red Cross and Red Crescent Movement in 1997 to specify which Red Cross entity takes the lead role in different scenarios.

The full name of the agreement is the Agreement on the organization of the international activities of the components of the International Red Cross and Red Crescent Movement.

== Background ==
The Seville Agreement was the latest of several "peace treaties" that sought to end turf wars between the International Committee of the Red Cross (ICRC) and the International Federation of Red Cross and Red Crescent Societies (IFRC). Others were drafted in 1969, 1974, and 1989.

== Details of the agreement ==
The Seville Agreement identified the ICRC as lead agency in protecting persons caught in armed conflict or internal strife as well as managing the "immediate effects" of refugees or natural disasters that occur during armed conflict. The IFRC takes the lead in response to natural disasters or when the capacity of the national societies is overwhelmed. National Societies take the lead when both the ICRC and IFRC concur.

== 2005 strengthening ==
At the Council of Delegates in Seoul in 2005, the Seville Agreement was strengthened by the adoption of a set of "supplementary measures". These supplementary measures were designed to enhance the Seville Agreement. The measures include steps to clarify the respective roles of the "lead agency" and the host national society:

The latter should maintain its role and mandate at all times and therefore be the primary partner of the lead agency. All other components involved in an international operation should support an increased role for the host national society in the direction and coordination of activities.

Moreover, the function of lead agency is defined as a temporary response to a particular emergency. The supplementary measures also mention different steps to promote better knowledge of the agreement within the movement itself. They call on the ICRC and the IFRC to design training modules on the agreement with the involvement of national societies and ask all components to conduct training sessions for staff and volunteers.

== 2022 Seville Agreement 2.0 ==
In 2022, the Seville Agreement 2.0 was agreed at the Council of Delegates. Seville 2.0 replaces the original Seville Agreement of 1997 and its supplementary measures adopted in 2005.

Seville 2.0 represents a significant change in that it identifies national Red Cross and Crescent organisations as the lead response agency of the Movement, in countries affected by natural and manmade disasters. Where a disaster might require a collective Movement response, it stipulates the National Society ''convenes'' while the IFRC and/or the ICRC act as ''co-conveners'' in case of natural disaster or armed conflict respectively.
