= International Red Cross and Red Crescent Movement =

International humanitarian movement

Coordinates: 46°13′40″N 6°8′14″E

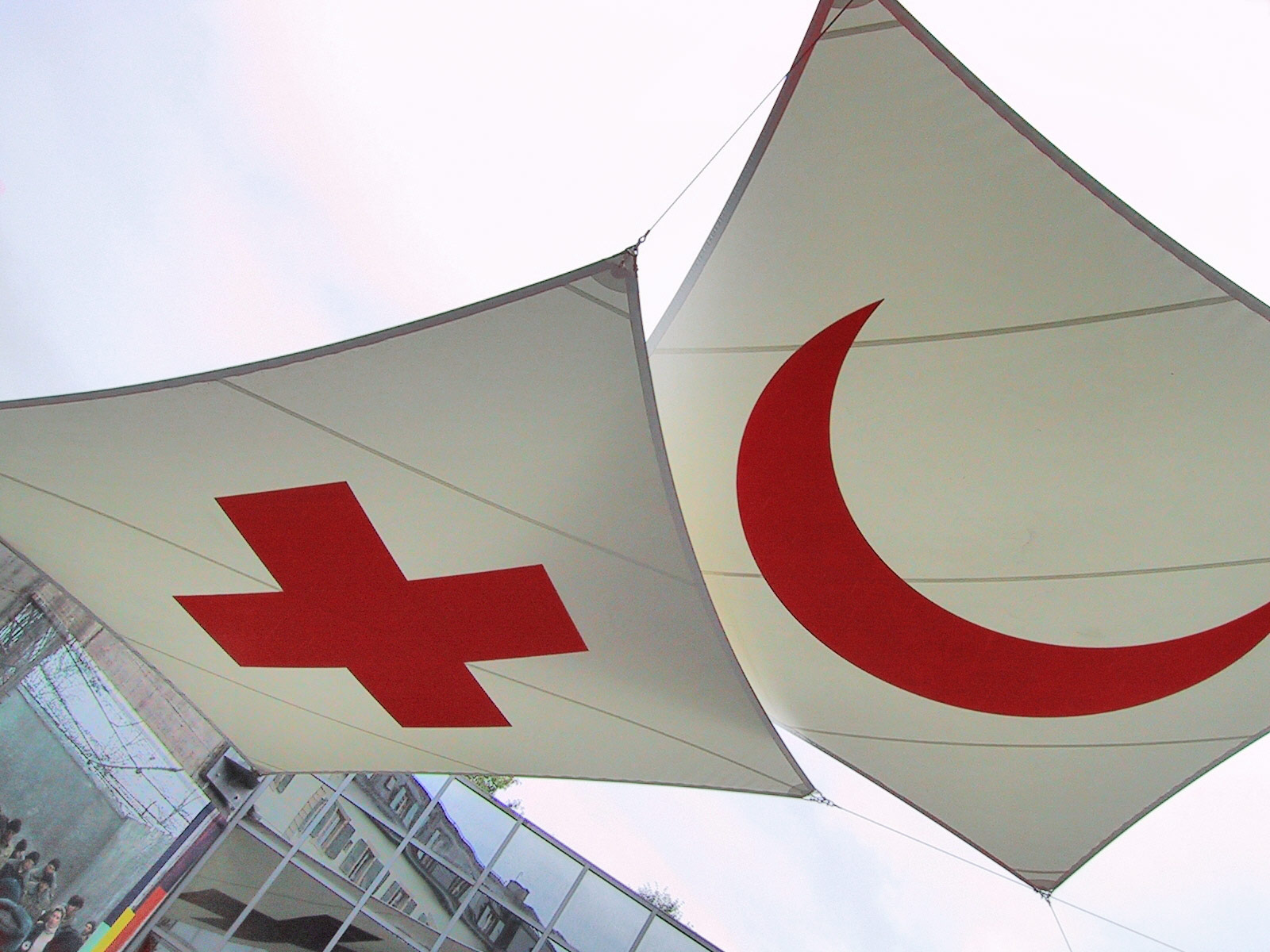
- The Red Cross and Red Crescent emblems, the symbols from which the movement derives its name, Geneva, 2005

- The three emblems in use: Red Cross, Red Crescent, Red Crystal

- Red Cross; Red Crescent; Magen David Adom; Red Cross Society that is not part of the International Federation of Red Cross and Red Crescent Societies; Red Crescent Society that is not part of the International Federation of Red Cross and Red Crescent Societies
- Abbreviation: ICRC and IFRC
- Founded: 9 February 1863; 163 years ago (International Committee of the Red Cross); 5 May 1919; 107 years ago (International Federation of Red Cross and Red Crescent Societies)
- Founders: Henry Dunant; Gustave Moynier; Théodore Maunoir; Guillaume Henri Dufour; Louis Appia
- Type: NGO, NPO
- Purpose: Humanitarianism
- Location: Geneva, Switzerland
- Origins: Geneva
- Region served: Worldwide
- Method: Aid
- Members: UN (United Nations General Assembly: both ICRC and IFRC)
- Key people: Mirjana Spoljaric Egger (president)
- Employees: c. 556.000
- Volunteers: c. 16.4 million
- Awards: Nobel Peace Prize (1917 ICRC, 1944 ICRC, 1963 ICRC & IFRC)
- Website: www.icrc.org www.redcross.int (archived)

The International Red Cross and Red Crescent Movement is a humanitarian movement with approximately 17 million volunteers, members, and staff worldwide. It was founded to protect human life and health, to ensure respect for all human beings, and to prevent and alleviate human suffering. The Movement has seven fundamental principles that inform its activities: humanity, impartiality, neutrality, independence, voluntary service, unity, and universality.

The Movement contributed to the meeting of the first and subsequent Geneva Conventions, and the foundation of the International Committee of the Red Cross (ICRC) and the International Federation of Red Cross and Red Crescent Societies (IFRC). The Geneva Conventions created the international treaties and humanitarian laws that primarily govern war-time conduct, which the ICRC helped to develop. The ICRC supplies aid to war-impacted areas, promotes humanitarian standards, and reviews compliance with the Geneva Conventions and humanitarian law in areas experiencing violent conflicts. Similarly, the IFRC provides support to areas in need of aid due to non-violent issues, such as famine, disease, and man-made and natural disasters. It is partially distinguished from the ICRC by its function as a cooperative network between national Red Cross and Red Crescent societies to coordinate international aid delivery.

== History ==
=== Foundation ===
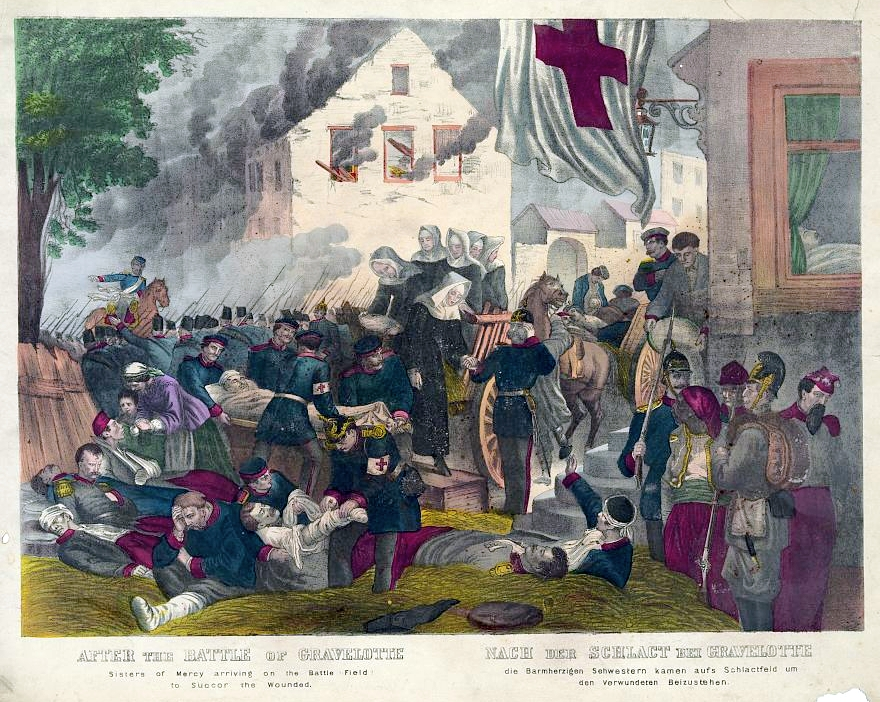
The Red Cross, after the Battle of Gravelotte in 1870

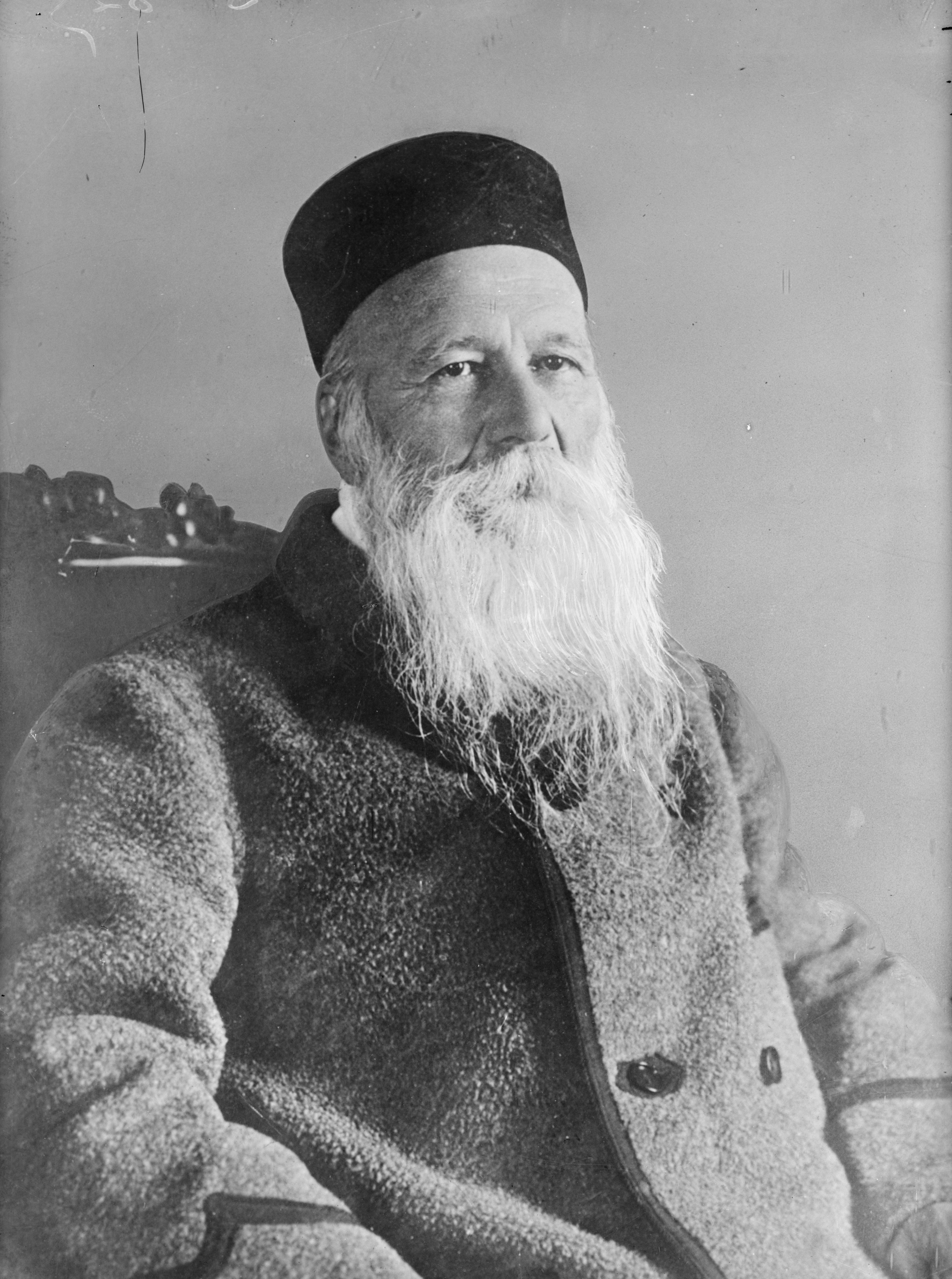
Henry Dunant, author of A Memory of Solferino

Until the middle of the nineteenth century, there were no organized or well-established army nursing systems for casualties, nor safe or protected institutions to accommodate and treat those who were wounded on the battlefield. In June 1859, Swiss businessman Jean-Henri Dunant, a devout Calvinist, traveled to Italy to meet then-French emperor Napoleon III with the intention of discussing difficulties in conducting business in Algeria, which at that time was occupied by France. He arrived in the small town of Solferino on the evening of 24 June after the Battle of Solferino, an engagement in the Austro-Sardinian War. In a single day, about 40,000 soldiers on both sides died or were left wounded on the field. Dunant was shocked by the terrible aftermath of the battle, the suffering of the wounded soldiers, and the near-total lack of medical attendance and basic care. He completely abandoned the original intent of his trip and for several days he devoted himself to helping with the treatment and care of the wounded. He took part in organizing an overwhelming level of relief assistance with the local villagers to aid without discrimination.

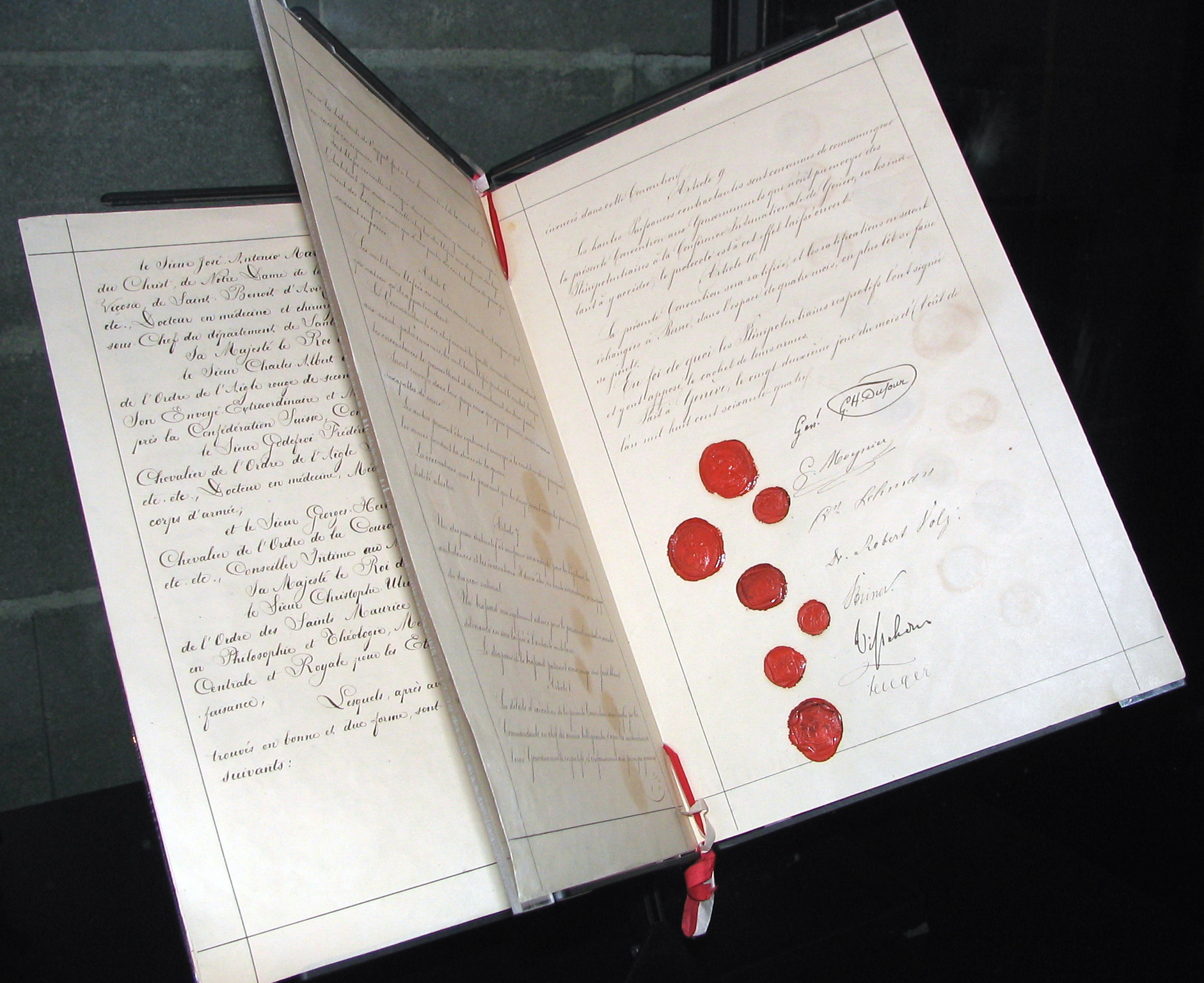
Original document of the First Geneva Convention, 1864

Back at his home in Geneva, he decided to write a book entitled A Memory of Solferino, which he published using his own money in 1862. He sent copies of the book to leading political and military figures throughout Europe and to people he thought could help him make a change. His book included vivid descriptions of his experiences in Solferino in 1859, and he explicitly advocated the formation of national voluntary relief organizations to help nurse wounded soldiers in the case of war, inspired by Christian teaching regarding social responsibility and his experience after the battlefield of Solferino. He called for the development of an international treaty to guarantee the protection of medics and field hospitals for soldiers wounded on the battlefield.

In 1863, Gustave Moynier, a Geneva lawyer and president of the Geneva Society for Public Welfare, received a copy of Dunant's book and introduced it for discussion at a meeting of that society. As a result of this initial discussion, the society established an investigatory commission to examine the feasibility of Dunant's suggestions and eventually to organize an international conference about their possible implementation. The members of this committee, which has subsequently been referred to as the "Committee of the Five", aside from Dunant and Moynier, were physician Louis Appia, who had significant experience working as a field surgeon; Appia's friend and colleague Théodore Maunoir, from the Geneva Hygiene and Health Commission; and Guillaume-Henri Dufour, a Swiss army general of great renown. Eight days later, the five men decided to rename the committee to the "International Committee for Relief to the Wounded".

=== International conference ===
From 26 to 29 October, 1863, the international conference organized by the committee was held in Geneva to develop possible measures to improve medical services on the battlefield. The conference was attended by 36 individuals: eighteen official delegates from national governments, six delegates from non-governmental organizations, seven non-official foreign delegates, and the five members of the International Committee. The states and kingdoms represented by official delegates were: Swiss Confederation, Austrian Empire, Grand Duchy of Baden, Kingdom of Bavaria, French Empire, Kingdom of Hanover, Kingdom of Italy, Kingdom of the Netherlands, Kingdom of Prussia, Russian Empire, Kingdom of Saxony, Kingdom of Wurtemberg, United Kingdoms of Sweden and Norway, and United Kingdom of Great Britain and Ireland.

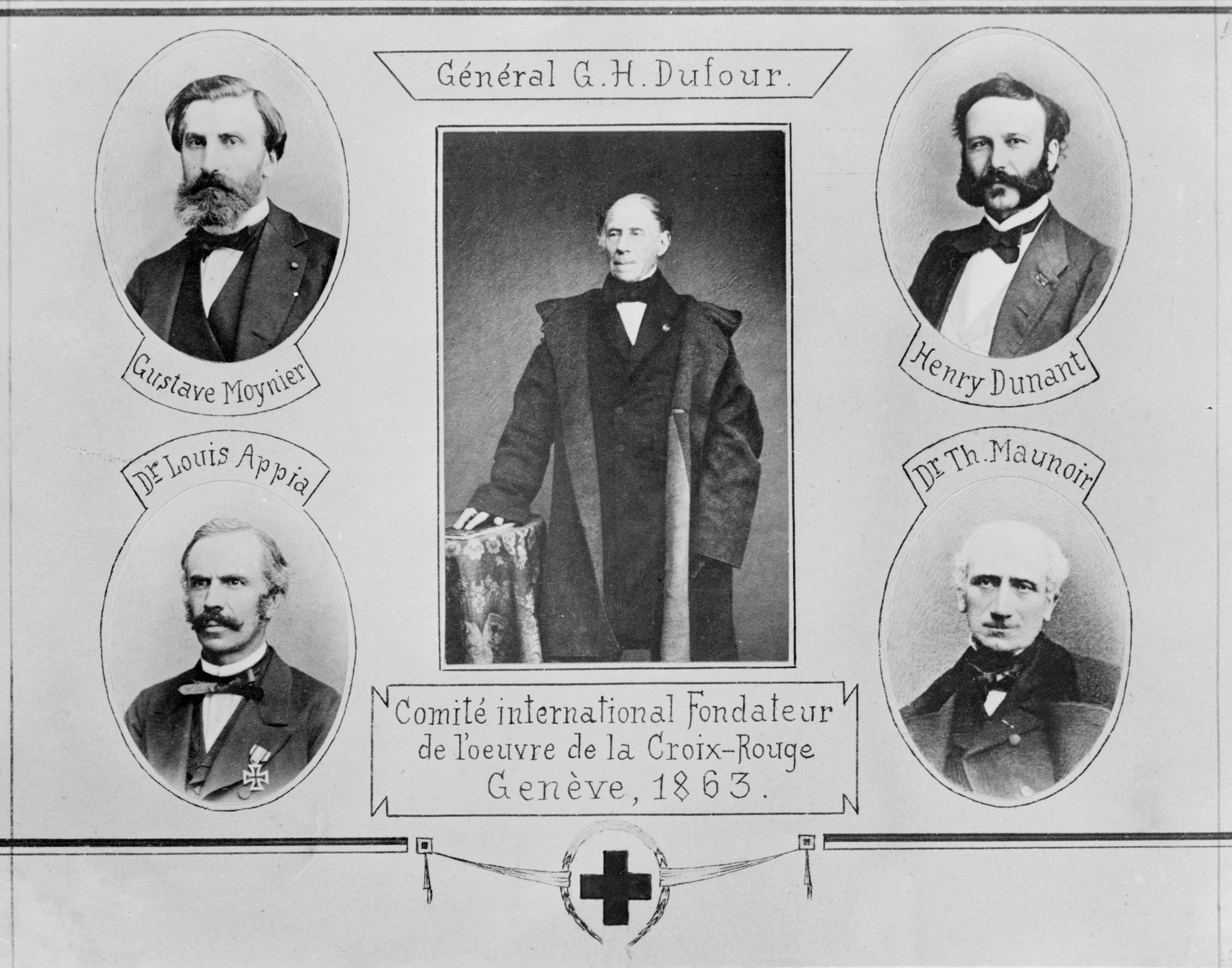
"Committee of the Five": Gustave Moynier, Guillaume-Henri Dufour, Henry Dunant, Louis Appia, Théodore Maunoir

Among the proposals written in the final resolutions of the conference, adopted on 29 October, 1863, were:

- The foundation of national relief societies for wounded soldiers
- Neutrality and protection for wounded soldiers
- The utilization of volunteer forces for relief assistance on the battlefield
- The organization of additional conferences to enact these concepts
- The introduction of a common distinctive protection symbol for medical personnel in the field, namely a white armlet bearing a red cross

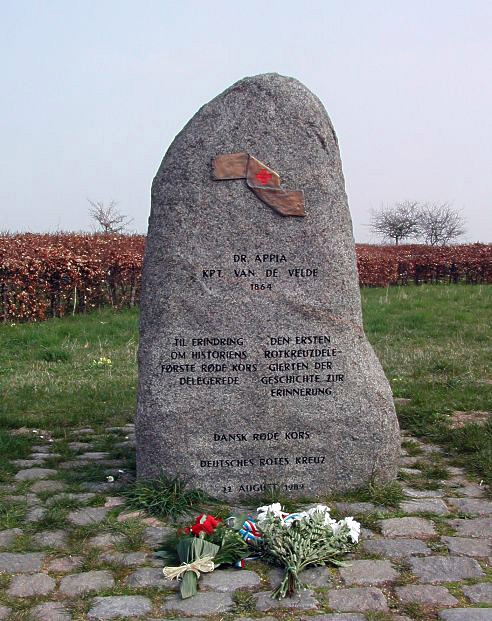
Memorial commemorating the first use of the Red Cross symbol in an armed conflict during the Battle of Dybbøl (Denmark) in 1864; jointly erected in 1989 by the national Red Cross societies of Denmark and Germany

=== Geneva Convention, national societies, and ICRC ===
Only a year later, the Swiss government invited the governments of all European countries, as well as the United States, the Empire of Brazil and the Mexican Empire, to attend an official diplomatic conference. Sixteen countries sent a total of 26 delegates to Geneva. On 22 August, 1864, the conference adopted the First Geneva Convention "for the Amelioration of the Condition of the Wounded in Armies in the Field". Representatives of 12 states and kingdoms signed the convention:

- Swiss Confederation
- Grand Duchy of Baden
- Kingdom of Belgium
- Kingdom of Denmark
- Kingdom of Spain
- French Empire
- Grand Duchy of Hesse
- Kingdom of Italy
- Kingdom of the Netherlands
- Kingdom of Portugal and the Algarves
- Kingdom of Prussia
- Kingdom of Württemberg

The convention contained ten articles, establishing for the first time legally binding rules guaranteeing neutrality and protection for wounded soldiers, field medical personnel, and specific humanitarian institutions in an armed conflict.

Directly following the establishment of the Geneva Convention, the first national societies were founded in Belgium, Denmark, France, Oldenburg, Italy, Prussia, Spain, and Württemberg. Also in 1864, Louis Appia and Charles van de Velde, a captain of the Dutch Army, became the first independent and neutral delegates to work under the symbol of the Red Cross in an armed conflict.

The government of the Ottoman Empire ratified this treaty on 5 July, 1865. The Turkish Red Crescent organization was founded in the Ottoman Empire in 1868, partly in response to the experience of the Crimean War (1853–1856), in which disease overshadowed battle as the main cause of death and suffering among Turkish soldiers. It was the first Red Crescent society of its kind and one of the most important charity organizations in the Muslim world. There was some discourse in Europe during the Great Eastern Crisis (the first use of the crescent symbol to mark medical personnel in international combat) as to whether the use of a crescent was allowed under the Geneva Convention. The Russian Empire and Austria-Hungary, the states most directly involved in the Crisis, both rejected the Red Crescent, however most other European powers accepted its validity.

In 1867, the first International Conference of National Aid Societies for the Nursing of the War Wounded was convened. Also in 1867, Jean-Henri Dunant was forced to declare bankruptcy due to business failures in Algeria, partly because he had neglected his business interests during his tireless activities for the International Committee. The controversy surrounding Dunant's business dealings and the resulting negative public opinion, combined with an ongoing conflict with Gustave Moynier, led to Dunant's expulsion from his position as a member and secretary. He was charged with fraudulent bankruptcy, and a warrant for his arrest was issued. Thus, he was forced to leave Geneva and never returned to his home city.

In the following years, national societies were founded in nearly every country in Europe. The project resonated well with patriotic sentiments that were on the rise in the late-nineteenth-century, and national societies were often encouraged as signifiers of national moral superiority. In 1876, the committee adopted the name "International Committee of the Red Cross" (ICRC), which is still its official designation today. Five years later, the American Red Cross was founded through the efforts of Clara Barton. More and more countries signed the Geneva Convention and began to respect it in practice during armed conflicts. In a rather short period of time, the Red Cross gained significant momentum as an internationally respected movement, and the national societies became increasingly popular as a venue for volunteer work.

When the first Nobel Peace Prize was awarded in 1901, the Norwegian Nobel Committee opted to give it jointly to Jean-Henri Dunant and Frédéric Passy, a leading international pacifist. More significant than the honor of the prize itself, this prize marked the overdue rehabilitation of Jean-Henri Dunant and represented a tribute to his key role in the formation of the Red Cross. Dunant died nine years later in the small Swiss health resort of Heiden. Only two months earlier, his long-standing adversary Gustave Moynier had also died, leaving a mark in the history of the committee as its longest-serving president ever.

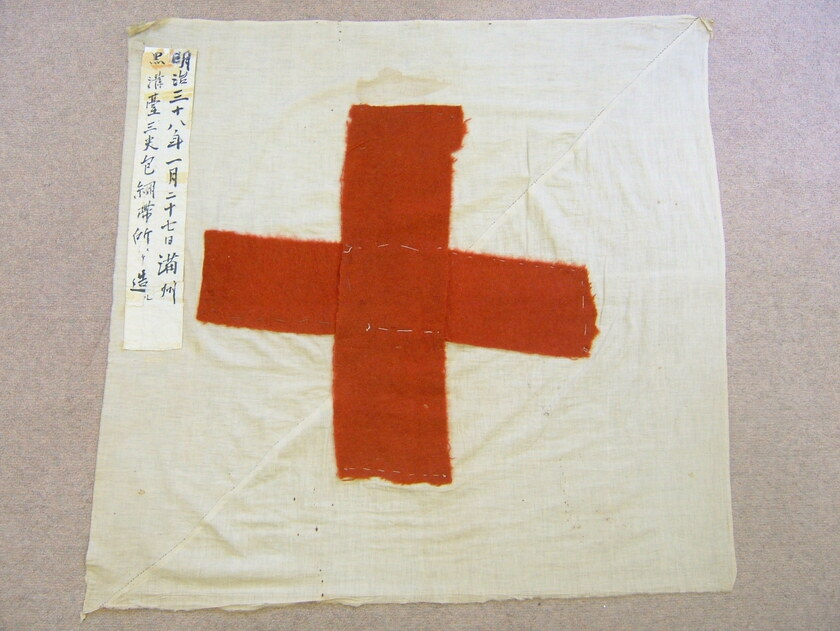
Gōtarō Mikami's Red Cross flag, with which he prevented an attack by the Russian army in 1905

In 1906, the 1864 Geneva Convention was revised for the first time. One year later, the Hague Convention X, adopted at the Second International Peace Conference in The Hague, extended the scope of the Geneva Convention to naval warfare. Shortly before the beginning of the First World War in 1914, 50 years after the foundation of the ICRC and the adoption of the first Geneva Convention, there were already 45 national relief societies throughout the world. The movement had extended itself beyond Europe and North America into Central and South America in the Argentine Republic, the United States of Brazil, the Republic of Chile, the Republic of Cuba, the United Mexican States, the Republic of Peru, the Republic of El Salvador, the Oriental Republic of Uruguay, and the United States of Venezuela; Asia, in the Republic of China, the Empire of Japan, and the Kingdom of Siam; and Africa, in the Union of South Africa.

=== World War I ===
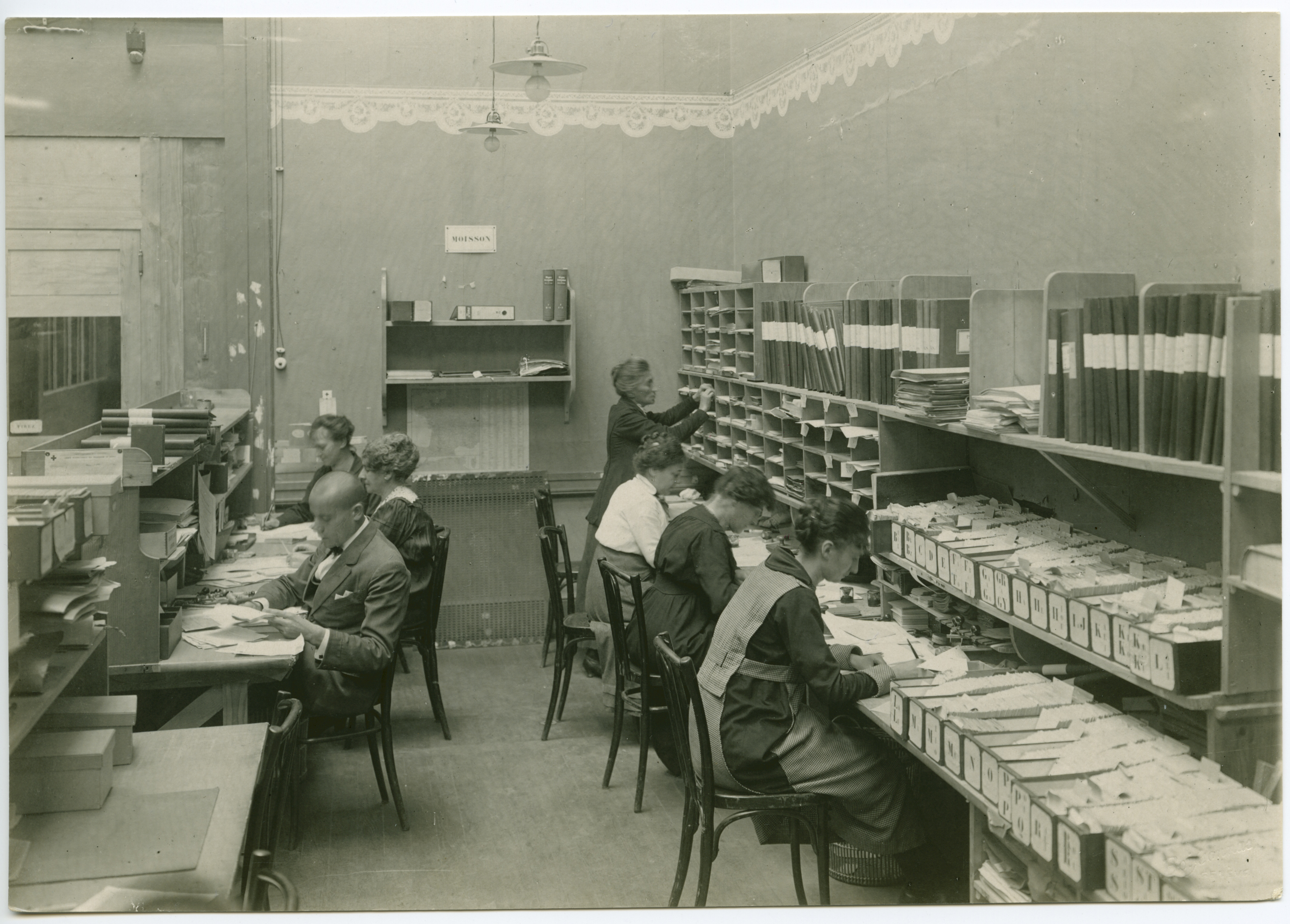
War 1914–1918. Geneva, Rath Museum. International Prisoners-of-War Agency. Researches department. German section. Express messages and communications to families.

With the outbreak of World War I, the ICRC found itself confronted with enormous challenges that it could handle only by working closely with the national Red Cross societies. Red Cross nurses from around the world, including the United States and Japan, came to support the medical services of the armed forces of the European countries involved in the war. On 15 August, 1914, immediately after the start of the war, the ICRC set up its International Prisoners-of-War Agency (IPWA) to trace Prisoners of war (POWs) and to re-establish communications with their respective families. The Austrian writer and pacifist Stefan Zweig described the situation at the Geneva headquarters of the ICRC:

Hardly had the first blows been struck when cries of anguish from all lands began to be heard in Switzerland. Thousands who were without news of fathers, husbands, and sons in the battlefields, stretched despairing arms into the void. By hundreds, by thousands, by tens of thousands, letters and telegrams poured into the little House of the Red Cross in Geneva, the only international rallying point that still remained. Isolated, like stormy petrels, came the first inquiries for missing relatives; then these inquiries themselves became a storm. The letters arrived in sackfuls. Nothing had been prepared for dealing with such an inundation of misery. The Red Cross had no space, no organization, no system, and above all no helpers.

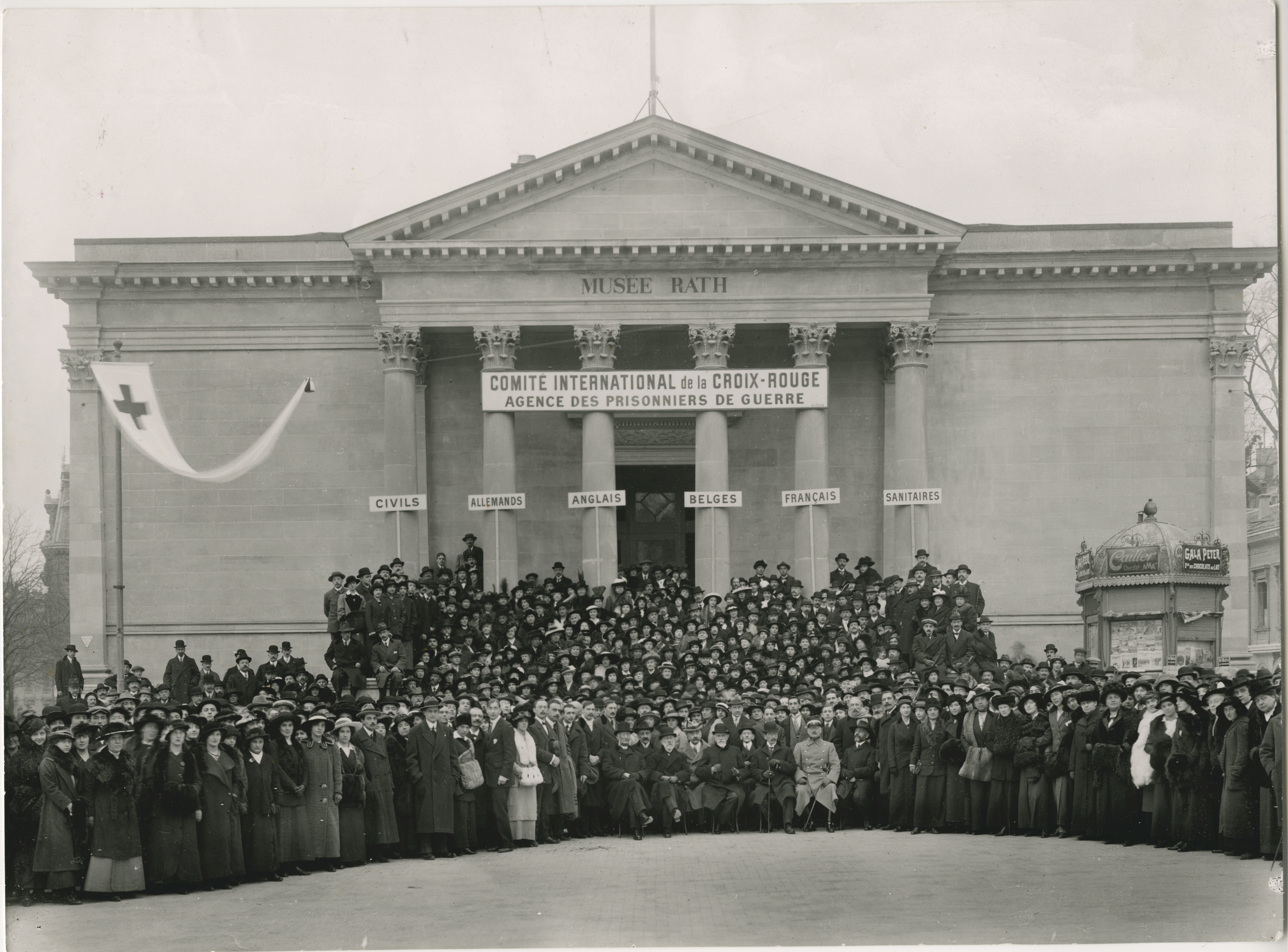
Group picture of the volunteers – mostly women – in front of the Musée Rath in 1914

However, by the end of the year, the Agency already had some 1,200 volunteers who worked in the Musée Rath of Geneva, amongst them the French writer and pacifist Romain Rolland. When he was awarded the Nobel Prize for Literature for 1915, he donated half of the prize money to the Agency. Most of the staff were women, some of whom – like Marguerite van Berchem, Marguerite Cramer, and Suzanne Ferrière – served in high positions as pioneers of gender equality in an organisation dominated by men.

By the end of the war, the Agency had transferred about 20 million letters and messages, 1.9 million parcels, and about 18 million Swiss francs in monetary donations to POWs of all affected countries. Furthermore, due to the intervention of the Agency, about 200,000 prisoners were exchanged between the warring parties, released from captivity, and returned to their home country. The organizational card index of the Agency accumulated about 7 million records from 1914 to 1923. The card index led to the identification of about 2 million POWs and the ability to contact their families. The complete index is on loan today from the ICRC to the International Red Cross and Red Crescent Museum in Geneva. The right to access the index is still strictly restricted to the ICRC.

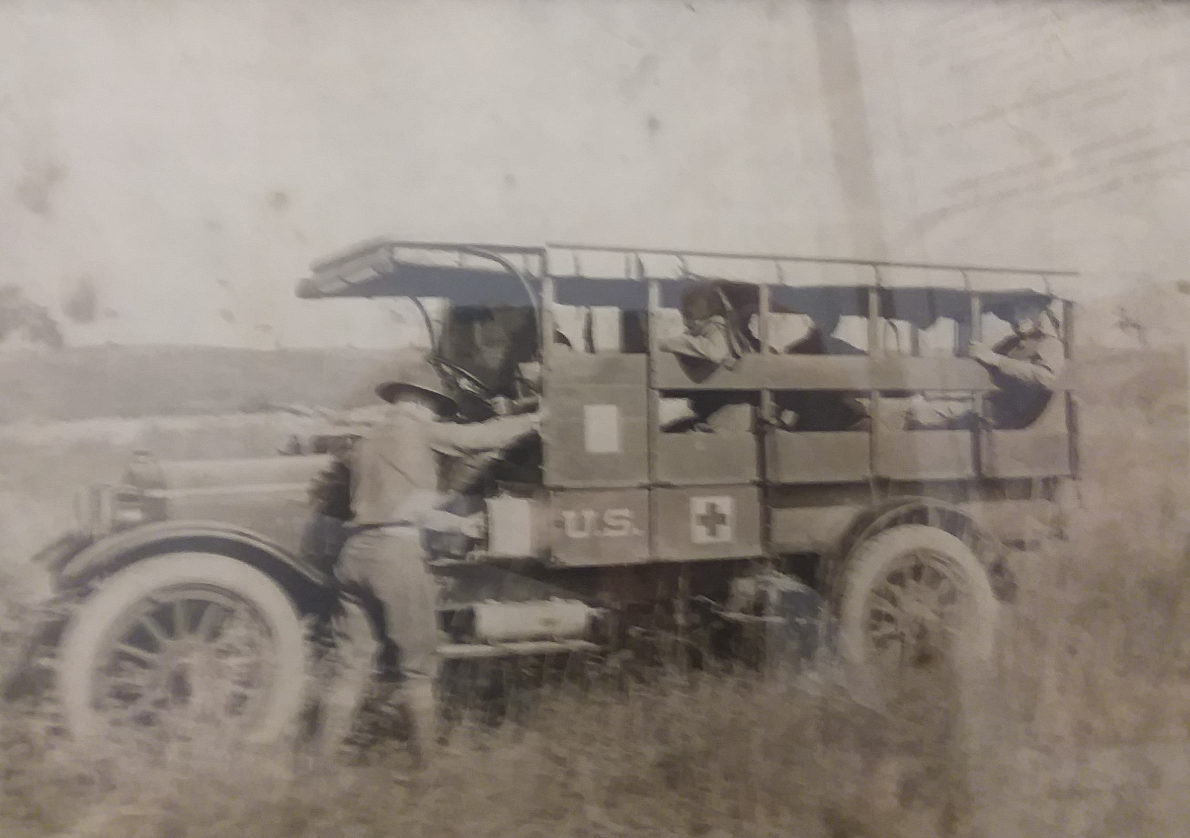
Red Cross ambulance from 1917

During the entire war, the ICRC monitored warring parties' compliance with the Geneva Conventions of the 1907 revision and forwarded complaints about violations to the respective country. When chemical weapons were used in this war for the first time in history, the ICRC mounted a vigorous protest against their use. Even without having a mandate from the Geneva Conventions, the ICRC tried to ameliorate the suffering of civil populations. In territories that were officially designated as "occupied territories", the ICRC could assist the civilian population on the basis of the Hague Convention's "Laws and Customs of War on Land" of 1907. This convention was also the legal basis for the ICRC's work for prisoners of war. In addition to the work of the International Prisoners-of-War Agency as described above, this included inspection visits to POW camps. A total of 524 camps throughout Europe were visited by 41 delegates from the ICRC through the end of the war.

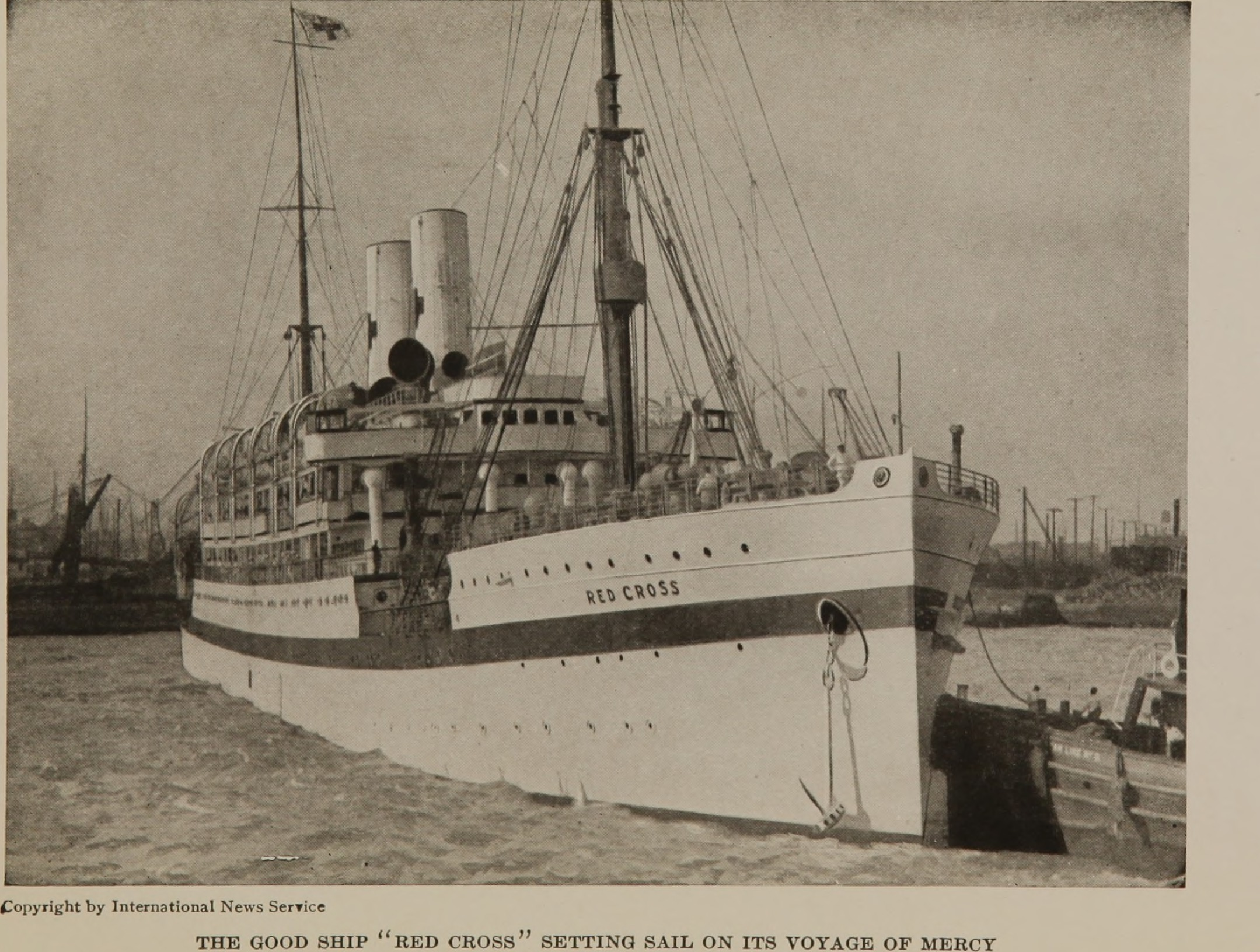
The MV Red Cross in New York harbour ca 1915

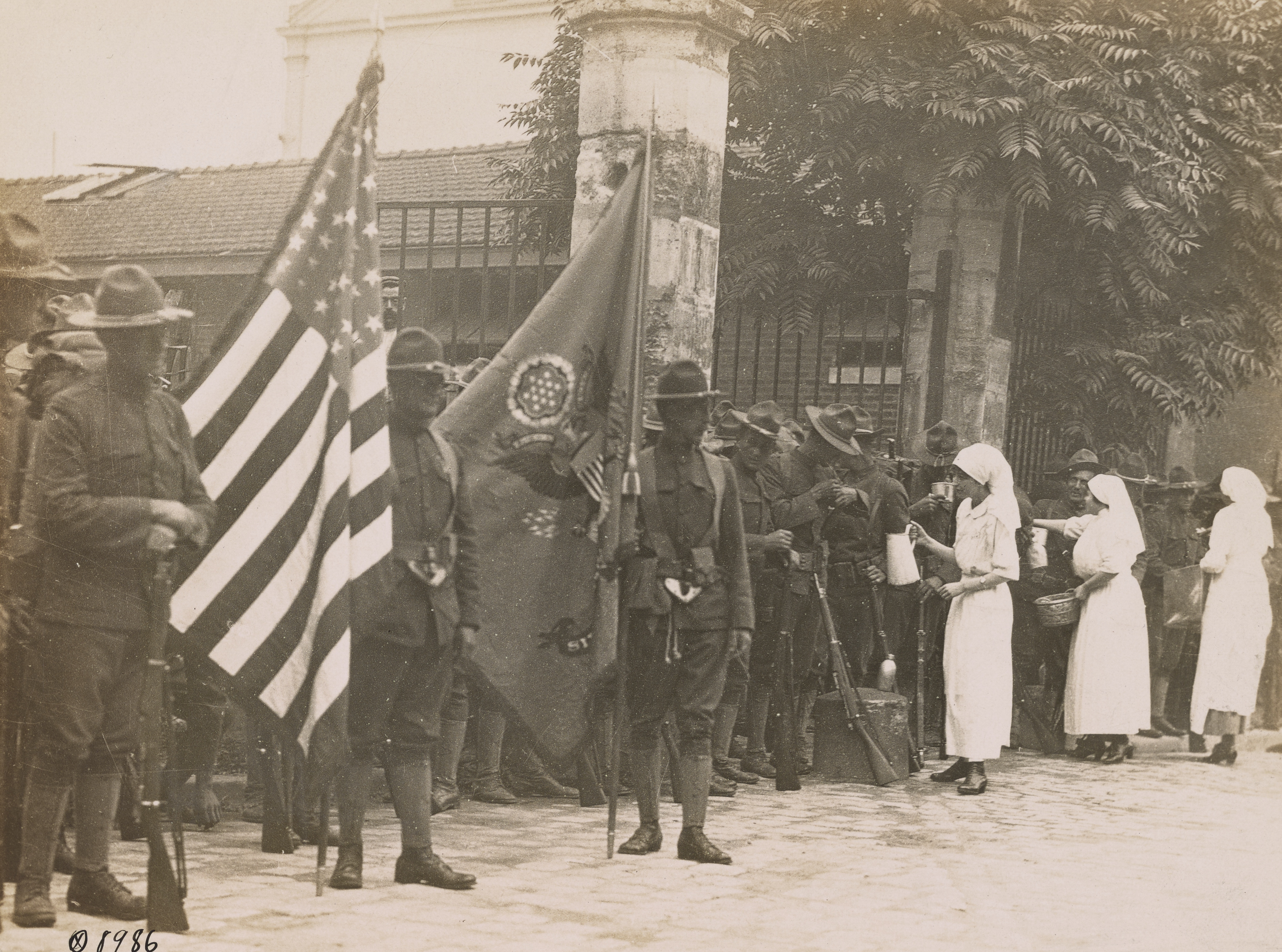
Red Cross nurses serving bread and coffee to American doughboys of the 16th Infantry, 1st Division, upon their arrival in Paris, July 4, 1917

Between 1916 and 1918, the ICRC published a number of postcards with scenes from the POW camps. The pictures showed the prisoners in day-to-day activities, such as the distribution of letters from home. The intention of the ICRC was to provide the families of the prisoners with some hope and solace, and to alleviate their uncertainties about the fate of their loved ones. After the end of the war, between 1920 and 1922, the ICRC organized the return of about 500,000 prisoners to their home countries. In 1920, the task of repatriation was handed over to the newly founded League of Nations, which appointed the Norwegian diplomat and scientist Fridtjof Nansen as its "High Commissioner for Repatriation of the War Prisoners". His legal mandate was later extended to support and care for war refugees and displaced persons when his office became that of the League of Nations "High Commissioner for Refugees". Nansen, who invented the Nansen passport for stateless refugees and was awarded the Nobel Peace Prize in 1922, appointed two delegates from the ICRC as his deputies. A year before the end of the war, the ICRC received the 1917 Nobel Peace Prize for its outstanding wartime work. It was the only Nobel Peace Prize awarded in the period from 1914 to 1918. In 1923, the International Committee of the Red Cross adopted a change in its policy regarding the selection of new members. Until then, only citizens from the city of Geneva could serve in the committee. This limitation was expanded to include all Swiss citizens. As a direct consequence of World War I, a treaty was adopted in 1925 which outlawed the use of suffocating or poisonous gases and biological agents as weapons. Four years later, the original Convention was revised with the Geneva Convention on the Wounded and Sick. The events of World War I and the respective activities of the ICRC significantly increased the reputation and authority of the Committee among the international community and led to an extension of its competencies.

As early as in 1934, a draft proposal for an additional convention for the protection of the civil population in occupied territories during an armed conflict was adopted by the International Red Cross Conference. Unfortunately, most governments had little interest in implementing this convention, and it was thus prevented from entering into force before the beginning of World War II.

=== World War II ===
Photo taken by Maurice Rossel at choreographed Theresienstadt visit. Most of the children were murdered at Auschwitz in the fall of 1944.

The Red Cross' response to the Holocaust has been the subject of significant controversy and criticism. As early as May 1944, the ICRC was criticized for its indifference to Jewish suffering and death—criticism that intensified after the end of the war, when the full extent of the Holocaust became undeniable.

One defense to these allegations was that the Red Cross was trying to preserve its reputation as a neutral and impartial organization by not interfering with what was viewed as a German internal matter. The Red Cross also considered its primary focus to be prisoners of war whose countries had signed the Geneva Convention.

The Geneva Conventions in their 1929 revision formed the legal basis of the work of the ICRC during World War II. The activities of the committee were similar to those during World War I: visiting and monitoring POW camps, organizing relief assistance for civilian populations, and administering the exchange of messages regarding prisoners and missing persons. By the end of the war, 179 delegates had conducted 12,750 visits to POW camps in 41 countries. The Central Information Agency on Prisoners-of-War (Agence centrale des prisonniers de guerre) had a staff of 3,000, the card index tracking prisoners contained 45 million cards, and 120 million messages were exchanged by the Agency. One major obstacle was that the Nazi-controlled German Red Cross refused to cooperate with the Geneva statutes, including blatant violations such as the deportation of Jews from Germany, and the mass murders conducted in the Nazi concentration camps.

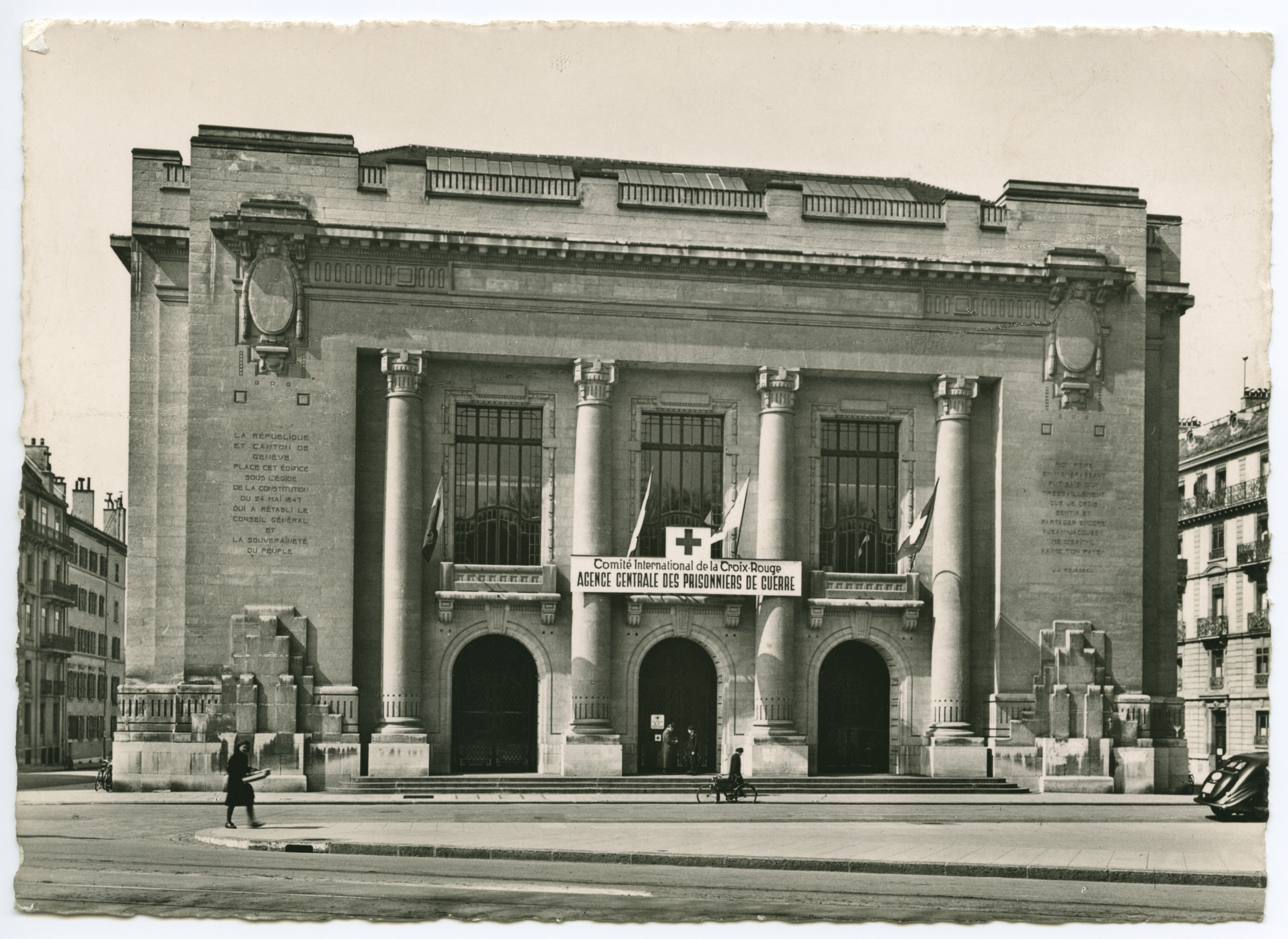
Central Prisoners of War Agency, Electoral building/Palace of the General Council, Geneva, photographed in 1939

Two other main parties to the conflict, the Soviet Union and Japan, were not party to the 1929 Geneva Conventions and were not legally required to follow the rules of the conventions.

During the war, the ICRC was unable to obtain an agreement with Nazi Germany about the treatment of detainees in concentration camps, and the ICRC eventually abandoned applying pressure, saying later it did so in order to avoid disrupting its work with POWs. The ICRC was also unable to obtain a response to reliable information about the extermination camps and the mass killing of European Jews, Roma, et al. After November 1943, the ICRC achieved permission to send parcels to concentration camp detainees with known names and locations. Because the notices of receipt for these parcels were often signed by other inmates, the ICRC managed to register the identities of about 105,000 detainees in the concentration camps and delivered about 1.1 million parcels, primarily to the concentration camps Dachau, Buchenwald, Ravensbrück, and Sachsenhausen.

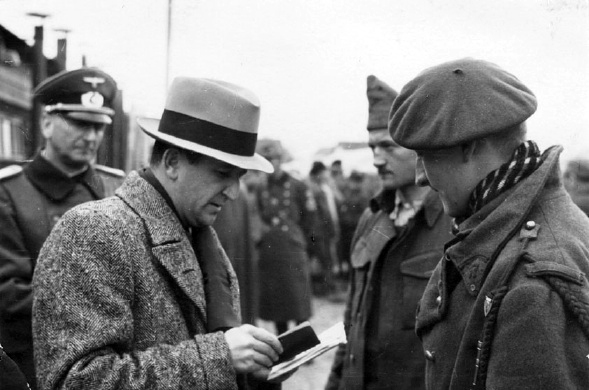
Marcel Junod, delegate of the ICRC, visiting POWs in Germany

Swiss physician Maurice Rossel was sent to Berlin as a delegate of the International Red Cross; he visited Theresienstadt Ghetto in 1944. The choice of the inexperienced Rossel for this mission has been interpreted as indicative of his organization's indifference to the "Jewish problem", while his report has been described as "emblematic of the failure of the ICRC" to advocate for Jews during the Holocaust. Rossel's report was noted for its uncritical acceptance of Nazi propaganda. (Note: Livia Rothkirchen: "In contrast to those of the Danish delegates, Rossel's report was phrased in positive terms, falling in line with German propaganda.") (Note: Lucy Dawidowicz: "[Rossel's] acceptance of everything he had seen ... and everything he had been told ... was total and complacent. The report which he prepared for his superiors in the Red Cross was exactly what the Germans had hoped for ... a totally uncritical, even approving affirmation of their propaganda.") He erroneously stated that Jews were not deported from Theresienstadt. Claude Lanzmann recorded his experiences in 1979, producing a documentary entitled A Visitor from the Living.

On 12 March, 1945, ICRC president Jacob Burckhardt received a message from SS General Ernst Kaltenbrunner allowing ICRC delegates to visit the concentration camps. This agreement was bound by the condition that these delegates would have to stay in the camps until the end of the war. Ten delegates, among them Louis Haefliger, Paul Dunant, and Victor Maurer, accepted the assignment and visited the camps: respectively, Haefliger, Dunant, and Maurer visited Mauthausen-Gusen, Theresienstadt, and Dachau. Louis Haefliger prevented the forceful eviction or blasting of Mauthausen-Gusen by alerting American troops.

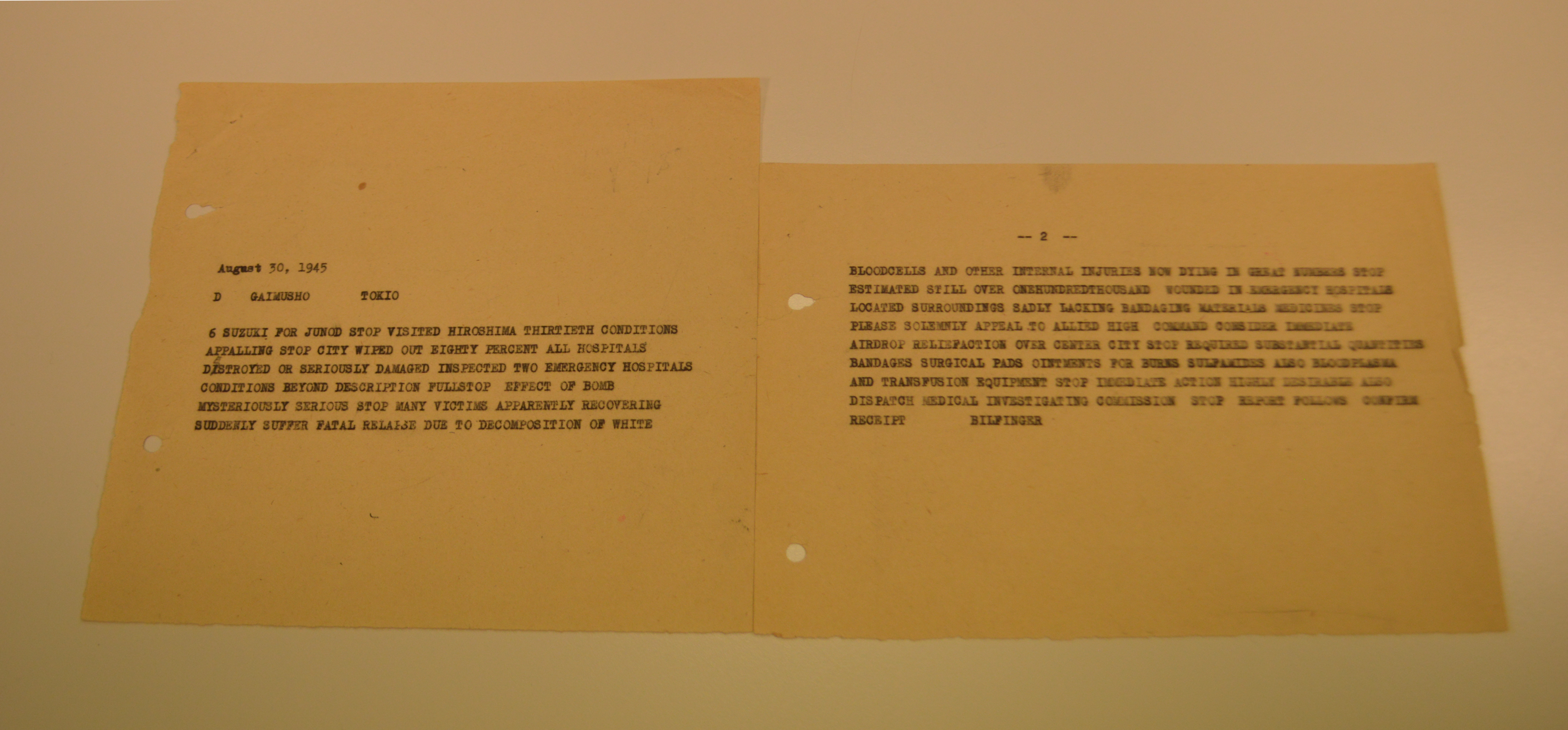
Telegram by ICRC delegate Fritz Bilfinger from Hiroshima three weeks after the atomic bombing

Friedrich Born (1903–1963), an ICRC delegate in Budapest, saved the lives of about 11,000 to 15,000 Jewish people in Hungary. Marcel Junod (1904–1961), a physician from Geneva, was one of the first foreigners to visit Hiroshima after the atomic bomb was dropped.

In 1944, the ICRC received its second Nobel Peace Prize. As in World War I, it received the only Peace Prize awarded during the main period of war, 1939 to 1945. At the end of the war, the ICRC worked with national Red Cross societies to organize relief assistance to those countries most severely affected. In 1948, the Committee published a report reviewing its war-era activities from 1 September, 1939 to 30 June, 1947. The ICRC opened its archives from World War II in 1996.

=== After World War II - 20th century ===
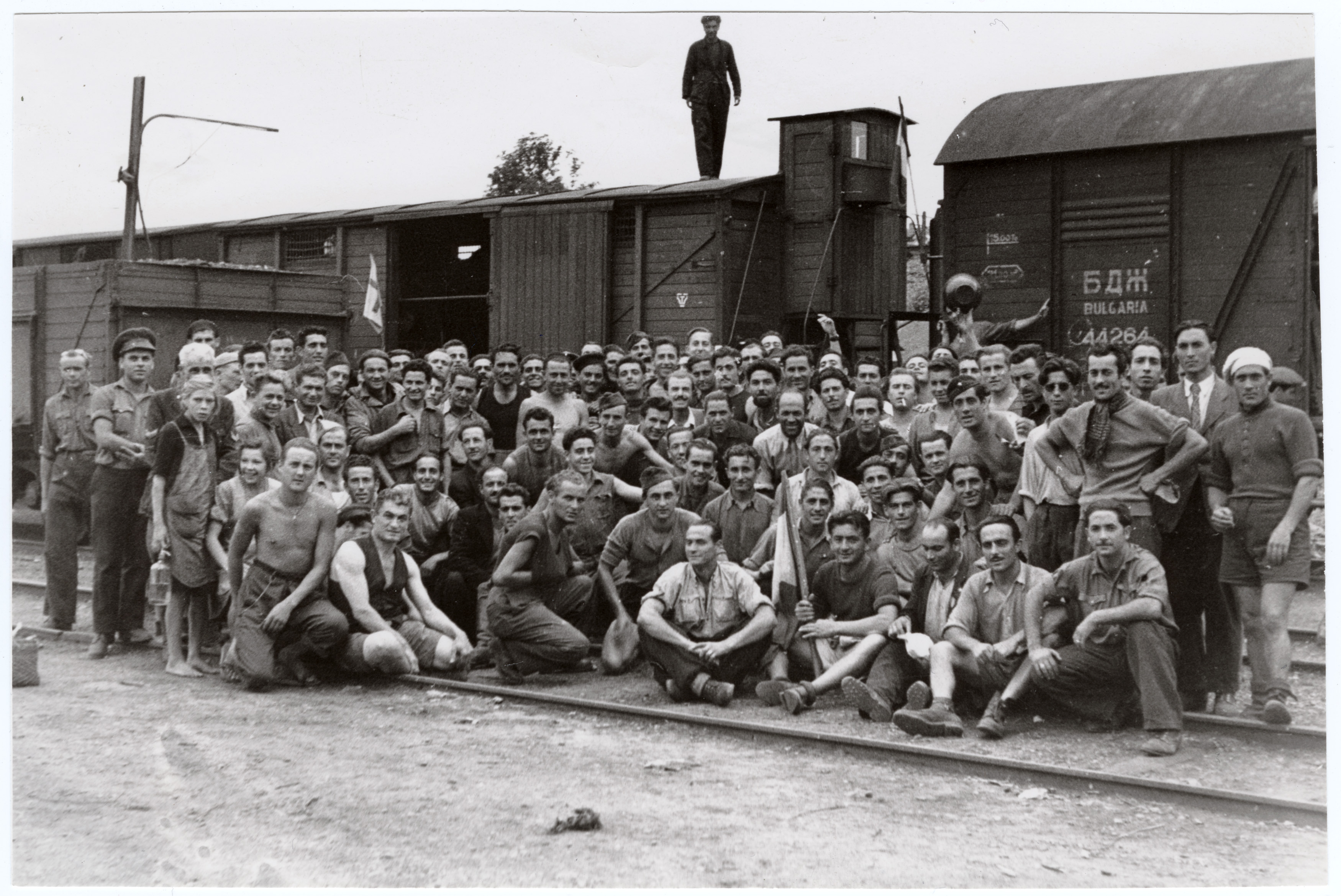
Budapest 1945. Repatriation of 2,000 Italian prisoners of war.

On 12 August, 1949, further revisions to the existing two Geneva Conventions were adopted. An additional convention "for the Amelioration of the Condition of Wounded, Sick and Shipwrecked Members of Armed Forces at Sea", now called the second Geneva Convention, was brought under the Geneva Convention umbrella as a successor to the 1907 Hague Convention X. The 1929 Geneva convention "relative to the Treatment of Prisoners of War" may have been the second Geneva Convention from a historical point of view (because it was actually formulated in Geneva), but after 1949 it came to be called the third Convention because it came later chronologically than the Hague Convention. Reacting to the experience of World War II, the Fourth Geneva Convention, a new Convention "relative to the Protection of Civilian Persons in Time of War", was established. Also, the additional protocols of 8 June, 1977 were intended to make the conventions apply to internal conflicts such as civil wars. Today, the four conventions and their added protocols contain more than 600 articles, while there were only 10 articles in the first 1864 convention.

In celebration of its centennial in 1963, the ICRC, together with the League of Red Cross Societies, received its third Nobel Peace Prize.

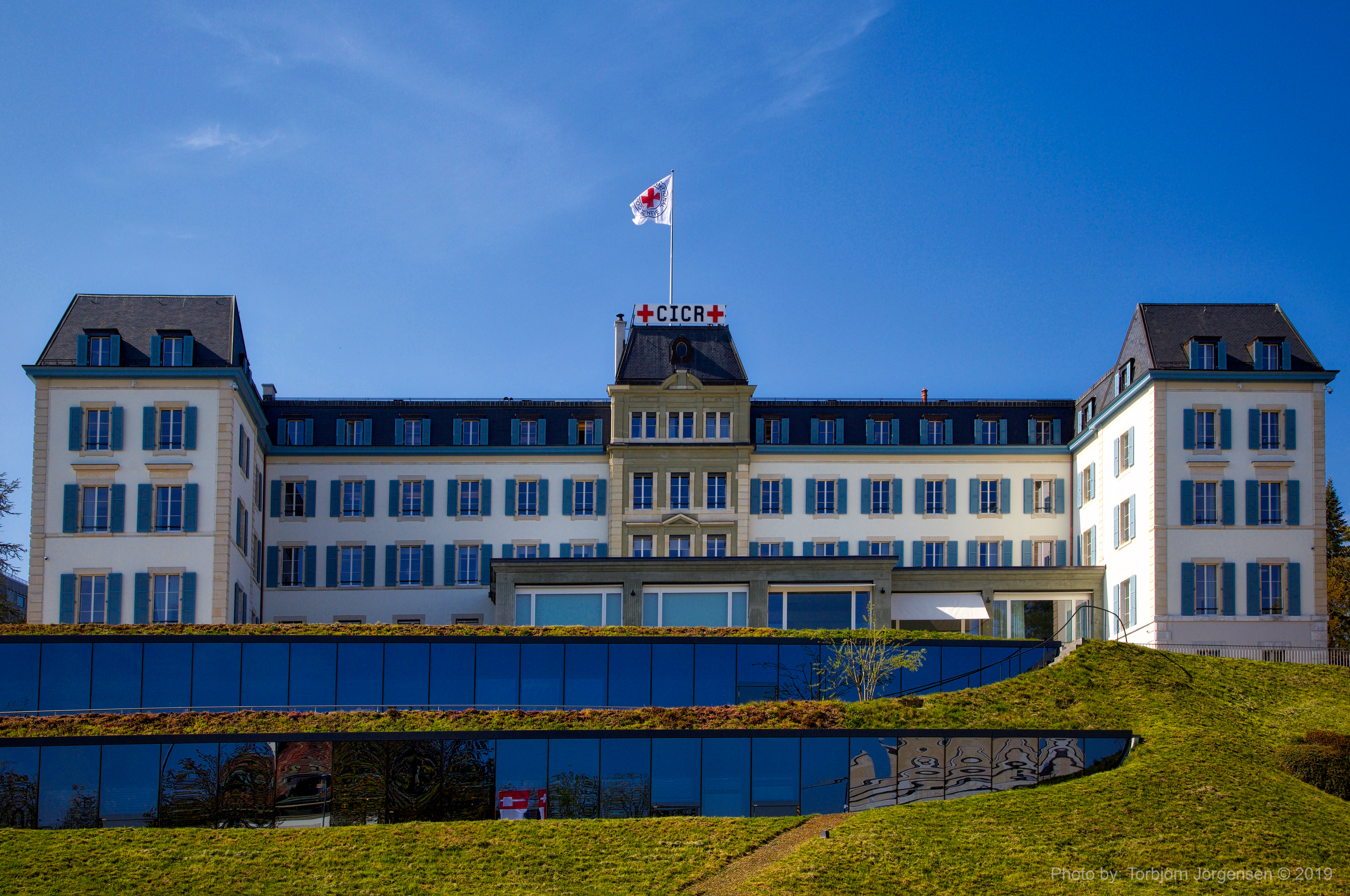
ICRC Headquarters in Geneva

On 16 October, 1990, the United Nations General Assembly granted the ICRC observer status for its assembly sessions and sub-committee meetings: the first observer status given to a private organization. The resolution was jointly proposed by 138 member states and introduced by the Italian ambassador, in memory of the organization's origins in the Battle of Solferino. An agreement with the Swiss government signed on 19 March, 1993 affirmed the already long-standing policy of full independence of the committee from any interference by Switzerland. The agreement protected the full sanctity of all ICRC property in Switzerland including its headquarters and archive, granted members and staff legal immunity, exempted the ICRC from all taxes and fees, guaranteed the protected and duty-free transfer of goods, services, and money, provided the ICRC with secure communication privileges at the same level as foreign embassies, and simplified Committee travel in and out of Switzerland.

At the end of the Cold War, the ICRC's work became more dangerous. In the 1990s, more delegates died than at any point in its history, especially when working in local and internal armed conflicts. These incidents often demonstrated a lack of respect for the rules of the Geneva Conventions and their protection symbols. Among the slain delegates were:

- Nancy Malloy (Canada) and five others. They were shot at point-blank range while sleeping on 17 December, 1996 in an ICRC field hospital in the Chechen city of Nowije Atagi near Grozny. Their murderers have never been caught.
- Ricardo Munguia (El Salvador). He was working as a water engineer in Afghanistan and travelling with local colleagues on 27 March, 2003 when their car was stopped by unknown armed men. He was shot, while his colleagues were allowed to escape. His killing prompted the ICRC to temporarily suspend operations across Afghanistan.
- Vatche Arslanian (Canada). He worked as a logistics coordinator for the ICRC mission in Iraq. He was killed while travelling through Baghdad together with members of the Iraqi Red Crescent. On 8 April, 2003, their car accidentally came into a cross-fire of fighting.
- On 27 January, 2002, Palestinian Red Crescent volunteer paramedic and suicide bomber Wafa Idris was transported to Jerusalem, by a Red Crescent ambulance, whose driver was part of the plot, and killed herself while committing the Jaffa Street bombing.

=== 21st century ===
==== Afghanistan ====
In the 2000s, the ICRC has been active in the Afghanistan conflict areas and has set up six physical rehabilitation centers to help land mine victims. Their support extends to the national and international armed forces, civilians, and the armed opposition. They regularly visit detainees under the custody of the Afghan government and the international armed forces, but have also occasionally had access since 2009 to people detained by the Taliban. They have provided basic first aid training and aid kits to both the Afghan security forces and Taliban members because, according to an ICRC spokesperson, "ICRC's constitution stipulates that all parties harmed by warfare will be treated as fairly as possible". In August 2021, when NATO-led forces retreated from Afghanistan, the ICRC decided to remain in the country to continue its mission to assist and protect victims of conflict. Since June 2021, ICRC-supported facilities have treated more than 40,000 people wounded during armed confrontations there.

==== Russo-Ukrainian war ====
Among the ten largest ICRC deployments worldwide has been the mission in Ukraine, where the organization has been active since 2014, working closely with the Ukrainian Red Cross Society. At first, the ICRC was active primarily in the disputed regions of Donbas, assisting persons injured by the fighting there. When Russia invaded Ukraine on 24 February 2022, the fighting moved to more populated areas in East, North, and South Ukraine. The head of the ICRC delegation in Kyiv warned on 26 February, 2022 that neighborhoods of major cities were becoming the frontline with significant consequences for their populations, including children, the sick, and elderly. The ICRC urgently called on all parties to the conflict not to forget their obligations under international humanitarian law to ensure the protection of the civilian population and infrastructure, and respect the dignity of refugees and prisoners of war.

In response to events in the conflict, the organisation issued a rule of engagement for civilian hackers.

==== Gaza war ====
Prior to the Gaza war, Israeli authorities required Palestinian ambulances to undergo thorough searches when passing through checkpoints, alleging without proof that the policy was driven by Palestinian organizations using ambulances to transport militants and armaments. The Israeli Ministry of Health said that:

"The Red Crescent closely cooperated with the MDA (Magen David Adom) until April 2002. At that time, the IDF claimed that Red Crescent ambulances were being used to carry terrorists. The Red Crescent personnel involved in this violation were interrogated."

In October 2023, the ICRC responded to the conflict that has resulted in the deaths of tens of thousands of civilians, calling the violence "abhorrent" and imploring both sides to reduce the suffering of civilians.

The ICRC, working closely with their Red Crescent partners, has a neutral, independent and exclusively humanitarian mandate during such escalations of violence in the Middle East and urged all parties to protect the lives of civilians, to reduce their suffering, and protect their dignity. In the midst of the violence, the ICRC and the Palestinian Red Crescent Society (PRCS) provided hospitals in the Gaza strip with support through large humanitarian convoys from Egypt, and was seriously affected by numerous aerial attacks on medical facilities and ambulances.

The IFRC called for humanitarian access across Gaza and the West Bank, the release of hostages, the protection of civilians, hospitals and humanitarian workers from indiscriminate attack, and compliance with international humanitarian law to ensure its continued activities in the occupied Palestinian territories. The ICRC said in November that civilians have "overwhelmingly borne the brunt" of the fighting in the Palestinian enclave and Israel so far. Israeli forces have killed over 25,000 people, including civilians, Israeli nationals, and Hamas members in a devastating bombing campaign and ground offensive.

In late November 2023, the team of the ICRC started a multi-day operation to facilitate the release and transfer of hostages held in Gaza and of Palestinian prisoners to the West Bank. In early December, US Secretary of State Antony Blinken insisted that the Red Cross delegation must have access to the remaining hostages. The ICRC is not a negotiating power but the ICRC chief had direct talks with senior Hamas leader Ismail Haniyeh in Qatar in November, demanding direct access to the remaining hostages.

In January 2024, Israeli forces killed a Red Crescent crew who had been sent to rescue the Palestinian girl Hind Rajab, who was also killed by Israeli gunfire along with her family. Despite attempts by the Israel to deny responsibility for the killings, their involvement has been confirmed by repeated investigations by independent teams. Before sending its volunteers, the Red Crescent had previously coordinated the rescue route with the Israeli army.

In March 2025, 8 Red Crescent workers, together with 7 other medics, were ambushed and killed by Israeli soldiers near Rafah. It was the deadliest attack on Red Crescent personnel since 2017. One worker, who was later killed, recorded the arrival of the paramedic convoy at the site of a distress call and the start of the shooting: a group of medics in reflective outfits, driving well-marked emergency vehicles with flashing lights and headlights on, approached a previously attacked Red Crescent ambulance before being shot at for five minutes. Access to the site was originally forbidden, though satellite images showed the six vehicles were moved to the roadside, crushed, and buried by Israeli bulldozers. Five days after the shooting, the UN and Red Crescent negotiated access to the site and found the bodies buried in a mass grave alongside the vehicles. One witness survived, who was imprisoned by the Israeli Defense Forces (IDF) for two months following the incident. The video was released a month later, drawing international condemnation and criticism to the IDF over a statement it had made after the attack. (Note: Namely regarding its claim that the vehicles approached suspiciously with lights turned off, and that Hamas militants, either six or nine of them depending on the source, were among those killed.) The IDF claimed that a self-investigation had shown that the unit's commanding officer gave an inaccurate and incomplete account of the attack, and the unit's commander was fired.

=== League of Red Cross Societies (IFRC) ===
==== History ====
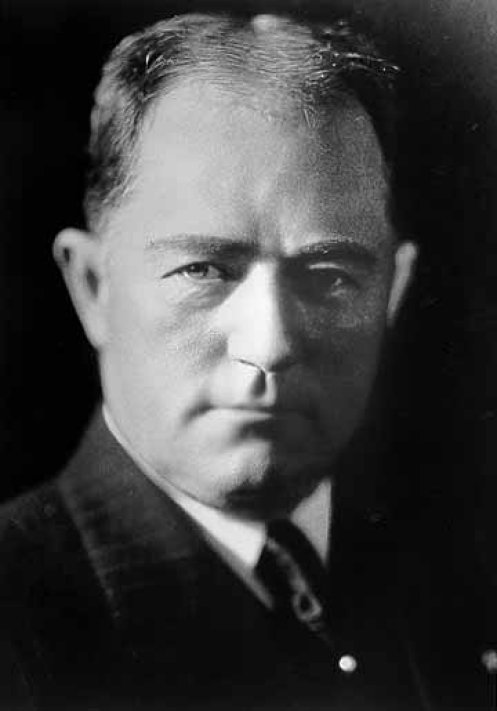
Henry Davison, founding father of the League of Red Cross societies

In 1919, representatives from the national Red Cross societies of Britain, France, Italy, Japan, and the US came together in Paris to found the "League of Red Cross Societies". The original idea came from Henry Davison, who was then president of the American Red Cross (ARC). This move, led by the American Red Cross, expanded the international activities of the Red Cross movement beyond the strict mission of the ICRC to include relief assistance in response to emergency situations which were not caused by war (such as man-made or natural disasters). The ARC already had great disaster relief mission experience extending back to its foundation.

The formation of the League, as an additional international Red Cross organization alongside the ICRC, was not without controversy for a number of reasons. The ICRC had, to some extent, valid concerns about a possible rivalry between the two organizations. The foundation of the League was seen as an attempt to undermine the leadership position of the ICRC within the movement and to gradually transfer most of its tasks and competencies to a multilateral institution. In addition to that, all founding members of the League were national societies from countries of the Entente or from associated partners of the Entente. The original statutes of the League from May 1919 contained further regulations which gave the five founding societies a privileged status and, due to the efforts of Henry Davison, the right to permanently exclude the national Red Cross societies from the countries of the Central Powers, namely Germany, Austria, Hungary, Bulgaria and Turkey, and additionally the national Red Cross society of Russia. These rules were contrary to the Red Cross principles of universality and equality among all national societies, a situation which furthered the concerns of the ICRC.

The first relief assistance mission organized by the League was an aid mission for the victims of a famine and subsequent typhus epidemic in Poland. Only five years after its foundation, the League had already issued 47 donation appeals for missions in 34 countries, an impressive indication of the need for this type of Red Cross work. The total sum raised by these appeals reached 685 million Swiss francs, which were used to bring emergency supplies to the victims of famines in Russia, Germany, and Albania; earthquakes in Chile, Persia, Japan, Colombia, Ecuador, Costa Rica, and Turkey; and refugee flows in Greece and Turkey. The first large-scale disaster mission of the League came after the 1923 earthquake in Japan which killed about 200,000 people and left countless more wounded and without shelter. Due to the League's coordination, the Red Cross society of Japan received goods from its sister societies reaching a total worth of about $100 million. Another important new field initiated by the League was the creation of youth Red Cross organizations within the national societies.

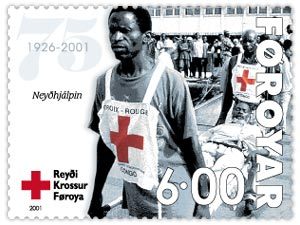
A stamp from the Faroe Islands

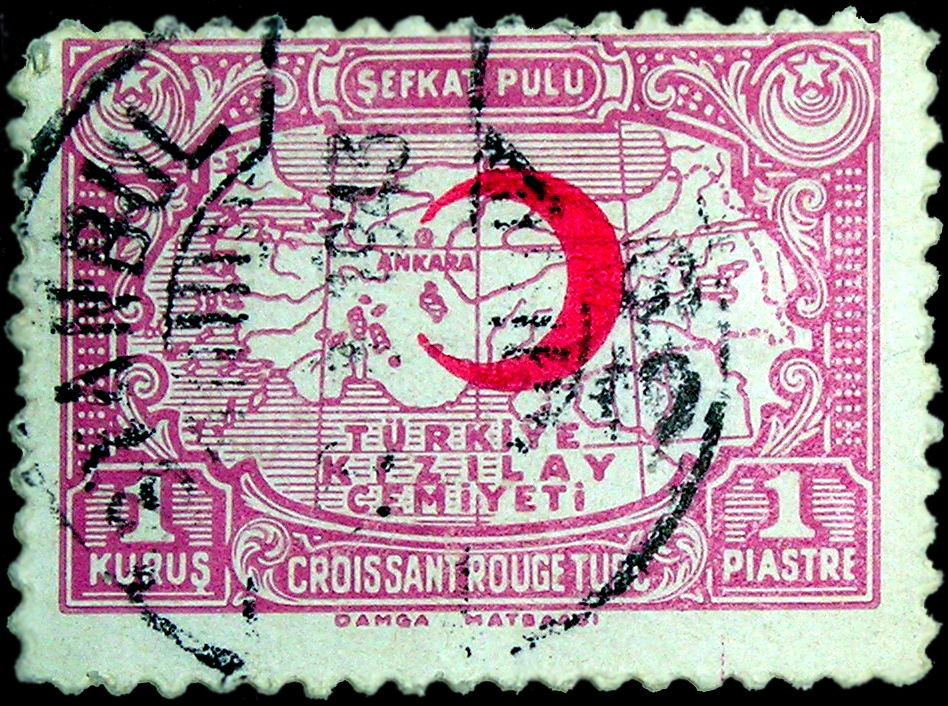
A stamp from Turkey

A joint mission of the ICRC and the League in the Russian Civil War from 1917 to 1922 marked the first time the movement was involved in an internal conflict, although still without an explicit mandate from the Geneva Conventions. The League, with support from more than 25 national societies, organized assistance missions and the distribution of food and other aid goods for civil populations affected by hunger and disease. The ICRC worked with the Russian Red Cross Society and later the society of the Soviet Union, constantly emphasizing the ICRC's neutrality. In 1928, the "International Council" was founded to coordinate cooperation between the ICRC and the League, a task which was later taken over by the "Standing Commission". In the same year, a common statute for the movement was adopted for the first time, defining the respective roles of the ICRC and the League within the movement.

During the Abyssinian war between Ethiopia and Italy from 1935 to 1936, the League contributed aid supplies worth about 1.7 million Swiss francs. Because the Italian fascist regime under Benito Mussolini refused any cooperation with the Red Cross, these goods were delivered solely to Ethiopia. During the war, an estimated 29 people died while being under explicit protection of the Red Cross symbol, most of them due to attacks by the Italian Army. During the civil war in Spain from 1936 to 1939, the League once again joined forces with the ICRC with the support of 41 national societies. In 1939, on the brink of the Second World War, the League relocated its headquarters from Paris to Geneva to take advantage of Swiss neutrality.

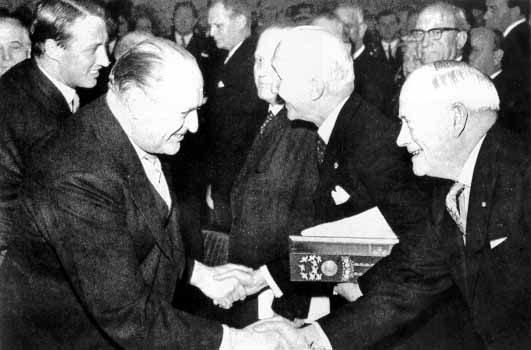
Peace Nobel Prize ceremony in 1963. From left to right: Crown Prince Harald of Norway, King Olav of Norway, ICRC president Leopold Boissier, League Chairman John A. MacAulay.

In 1952, the 1928 common statute of the movement was revised for the first time. Also, the period of decolonization from 1960 to 1970 was marked by a huge jump in the number of recognized national Red Cross and Red Crescent societies. By the end of the 1960s, there were more than 100 societies around the world. On 10 December, 1963, the Federation and the ICRC received the Nobel Peace Prize. In 1983, the League was renamed to the "League of Red Cross and Red Crescent Societies" to reflect the growing number of national societies operating under the Red Crescent symbol. Three years later, the seven basic principles of the movement as adopted in 1965 were incorporated into its statutes. The name of the League was changed again in 1991 to its current official designation as the International Federation of Red Cross and Red Crescent Societies (IFRC). In 1997, the ICRC and the IFRC signed the Seville Agreement which further defined the responsibilities of both organizations within the movement. In 2004, the IFRC began its largest mission to date after the tsunami disaster in South Asia. More than 40 national societies have worked with more than 22,000 volunteers to bring relief to the countless victims left without food and shelter and endangered by the risk of epidemics.

== Activities ==
=== Organization ===
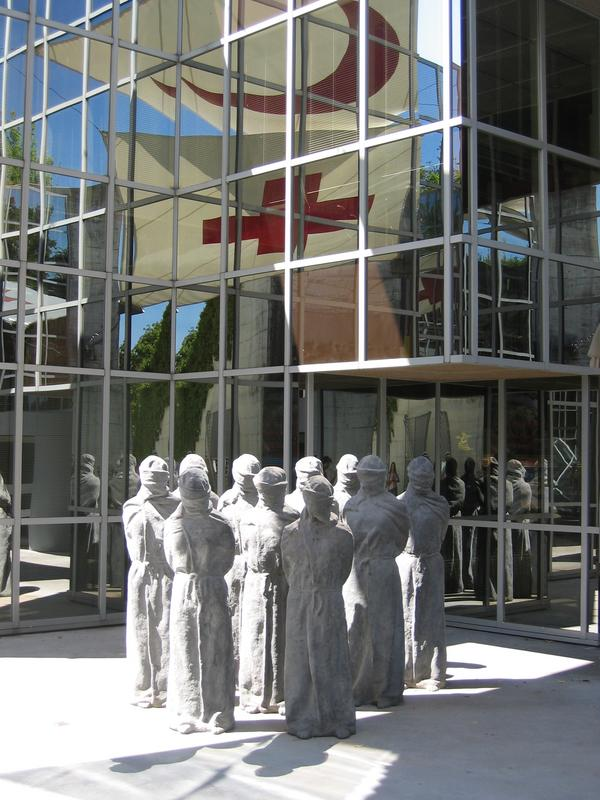
Entry to the International Red Cross and Red Crescent Museum in Geneva

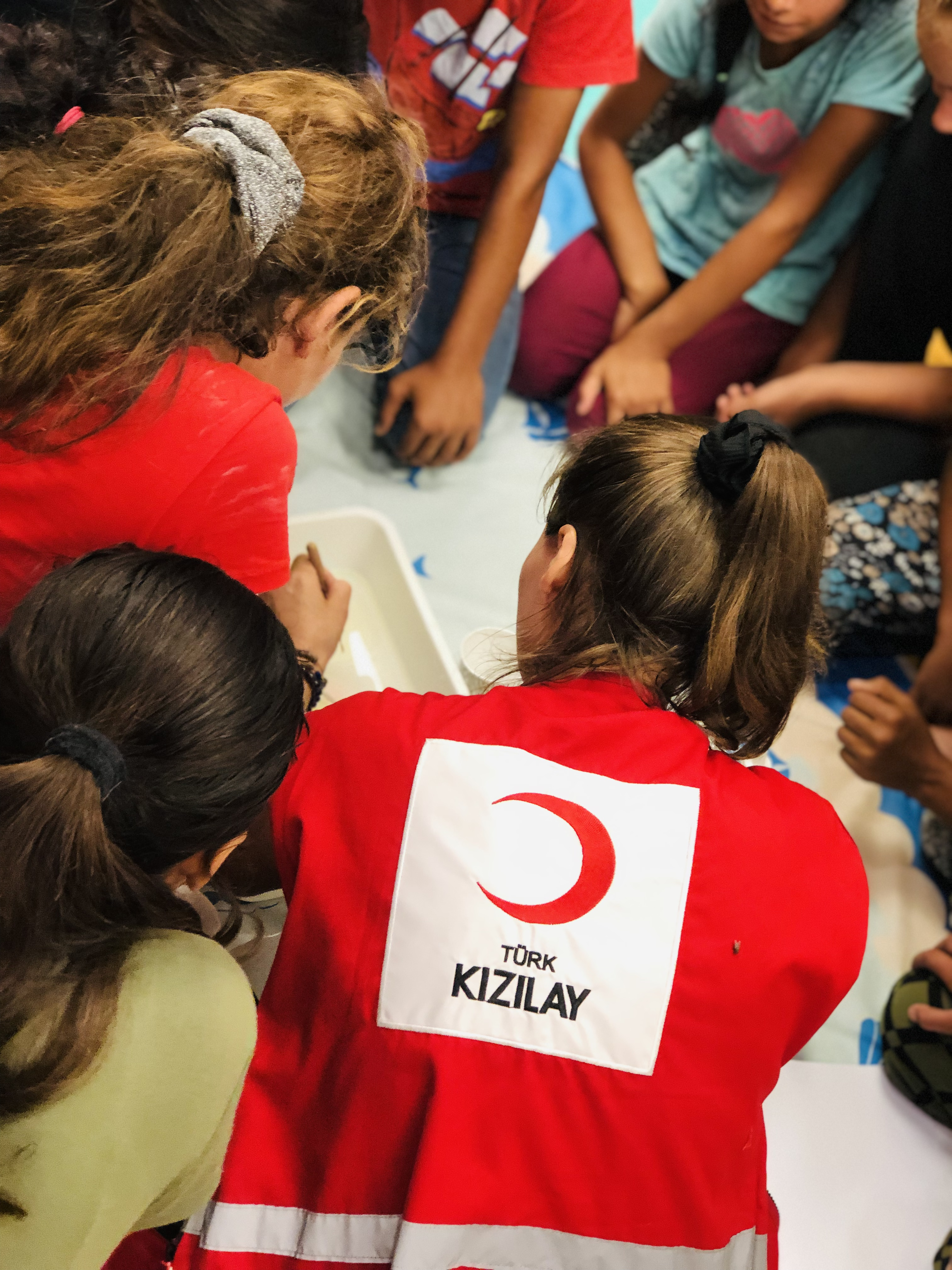
A Turkish Red Crescent staff conducting activities for children

Altogether, there are about 80 million people worldwide who serve with the ICRC, the International Federation, and the National Societies, the majority with the latter.

=== Fundamental principles ===
At the 20th International Conference in Neue Hofburg, Vienna, from 2 to 9 October, 1965, delegates proclaimed seven fundamental principles which are shared by all components of the Movement, and they were added to the official statutes of the Movement in 1986.

Fundamental Principles of the Red Cross and Red Crescent Movement
Principle	Definition
Humanity	The International Red Cross and Red Crescent Movement, born of a desire to bring assistance without discrimination to the wounded on the battlefield, endeavours, in its international and national capacity, to prevent and alleviate human suffering wherever it may be found. Its purpose is to protect life and health and to ensure respect for the human being. It promotes mutual understanding, friendship, cooperation and lasting peace amongst all peoples.
Impartiality	It makes no discrimination as to nationality, race, religious beliefs, class or political opinions. It endeavours to relieve the suffering of individuals, being guided solely by their needs, and to give priority to the most urgent cases of distress.
Neutrality	In order to continue to enjoy the confidence of all, the Movement may not take sides in hostilities or engage at any time in controversies of a political, racial, religious or ideological nature.
Independence	The Movement is independent. The National Societies, while auxiliaries in the humanitarian services of their governments and subject to the laws of their respective countries, must always maintain their autonomy so that they may be able at all times to act in accordance with the principles of the Movement.
Voluntary Service	It is a voluntary relief movement not prompted in any manner by desire for gain.
Unity	There can be only one Red Cross or one Red Crescent Society in any one country. It must be open to all. It must carry on its humanitarian work throughout its territory.
Universality	The International Red Cross and Red Crescent Movement, in which all Societies have equal status and share equal responsibilities and duties in helping each other, is worldwide.

=== International Conference and the Standing Commission ===
The International Conference of the Red Cross and Red Crescent, which occurs once every four years, is the highest institutional body of the Movement. It gathers delegations from all of the national societies as well as from the ICRC, the IFRC, and the signatory states to the Geneva Conventions. In between the conferences, the Standing Commission of the Red Cross and Red Crescent acts as the supreme body and supervises implementation of and compliance with the resolutions of the conference. In addition, the Standing Commission coordinates the cooperation between the ICRC and the IFRC. It consists of two representatives from the ICRC (including its president), two from the IFRC (including its president), and five individuals who are elected by the International Conference. The Standing Commission convenes every six months on average. Moreover, a convention of the Council of Delegates of the Movement takes place every two years in the course of the conferences of the General Assembly of the International Federation. The Council of Delegates plans and coordinates joint activities for the Movement.

== International Committee of the Red Cross (ICRC) ==
=== Mission and responsibilities ===
The emblem of the International Committee of the Red Cross

The official mission of the ICRC as an impartial, neutral, and independent organization is to stand for the protection of the life and dignity of victims of international and internal armed conflicts. According to the revised Seville Agreement of 2022, the ICRC is entrusted the role of "co-convener" with the national Red Cross or Crescent society in situations of international and non-international armed conflicts, internal strife and their direct results.

The core tasks of the committee, which are derived from the Geneva Conventions and its own statutes, are the following:

- to monitor compliance of warring parties with the Geneva Conventions
- to organize nursing and care for those who are wounded on the battlefield
- to supervise the treatment of prisoners of war
- to help with the search for missing persons in an armed conflict (tracing service)
- to organize protection and care for civil populations
- to arbitrate between warring parties in an armed conflict

=== Legal status and organization ===
The ICRC is headquartered in the Swiss city of Geneva and has offices in over 100 countries. It has more than 22,000 staff members worldwide, about 1,400 of them working in its Geneva headquarters, 3,250 expatriate staff serving as general delegates and technical specialists, and about 17,000 locally recruited staff. Due to Geneva's location in the French-speaking part of Switzerland, the ICRC usually acts under its French name, Comité international de la Croix-Rouge (CICR). The official symbol of the ICRC is the Red Cross on a white background with the words "COMITE INTERNATIONAL GENEVE" circling the cross.

According to Swiss law, the ICRC is defined as a private association. Contrary to popular belief, the ICRC is not a non-governmental organization in the most common sense of the term, nor is it an international organization. As it limits its members (a process called cooptation) to Swiss nationals only, it does not have a policy of open and unrestricted membership for individuals like other legally defined NGOs. The word "international" in its name does not refer to its membership but to the worldwide scope of its activities as defined by the Geneva Conventions. The ICRC has special privileges and legal immunities in many countries, based on national law in these countries or through agreements between the committee and respective national governments.

According to its statutes, it consists of 15 to 25 Swiss-citizen members, which it coopts for a period of four years. There is no limit to the number of terms an individual member can have, although a three-quarters majority of all members is required for re-election after the third term.

The leading organs of the ICRC are the Directorate and the Assembly. The Directorate is the executive body of the committee. It consists of a general director and five directors in the areas of "Operations", "Human Resources", "Resources and Operational Support", "Communication", and "International Law and Cooperation within the Movement". The members of the Directorate are appointed by the Assembly to serve for four years. The Assembly, consisting of all of the members of the committee, convenes regularly and is responsible for defining aims, guidelines, and strategies and for supervising the financial matters of the committee. The president of the Assembly is also the president of the committee as a whole. Furthermore, the Assembly elects a five-member Assembly Council which has the authority to decide on behalf of the full Assembly in some matters. The council is also responsible for organizing the Assembly meetings and for facilitating communication between the Assembly and the Directorate.

=== Funding and financial matters ===
The 2023 budget of the ICRC amounted to 2.5 billion Swiss francs. Most of that money came from states, including Switzerland in its capacity as the depositary state of the Geneva Conventions, from national Red Cross societies, the signatory states of the Geneva Conventions, and from international organizations like the European Union. All payments to the ICRC are voluntary and are received as donations based on two types of appeals issued by the committee: an annual Headquarters Appeal to cover its internal costs and Emergency Appeals for its individual missions. In 2023, Ukraine was the ICRC's biggest humanitarian operation (at 316.5 million Swiss francs), followed by Afghanistan (218 million francs), and Syria (171.7 million francs).

== International Federation of Red Cross and Red Crescent Societies (IFRC) ==
=== Mission and responsibilities ===
Emblem of the IFRC

The International Federation of Red Cross and Red Crescent Societies coordinates cooperation between national Red Cross and Red Crescent societies throughout the world and supports the foundation of new national societies in countries where no official society exists. On the international stage, the IFRC organizes and leads relief assistance missions after emergencies such as natural disasters, manmade disasters, epidemics, mass refugee flights, and other emergencies.

As per the 1997 Seville Agreement, the IFRC is the Lead Agency of the Movement in any emergency situation which does not take place as part of an armed conflict. The IFRC cooperates with the national societies of those countries affected – each called the Operating National Society (ONS) – as well as the national societies of other countries willing to offer assistance – called Participating National Societies (PNS). Among the 187 national societies admitted to the General Assembly of the International Federation as full members or observers, about 25–30 regularly work as PNS in other countries. The most active of those are the American Red Cross, the British Red Cross, the German Red Cross, and the Red Cross societies of Sweden and Norway. Another major mission of the IFRC which has gained attention in recent years is its commitment to work towards a codified, worldwide ban on the use of land mines and to bring medical, psychological, and social support for people injured by land mines.

The tasks of the IFRC can be summarized as follows:

- to promote humanitarian principles and values
- to provide relief assistance in emergency situations of large magnitude, such as natural disasters
- to support the national societies with disaster preparedness through the education of voluntary members and the provision of equipment and relief supplies
- to support local health care projects
- to support the national societies with youth-related activities

=== Legal status and organization ===
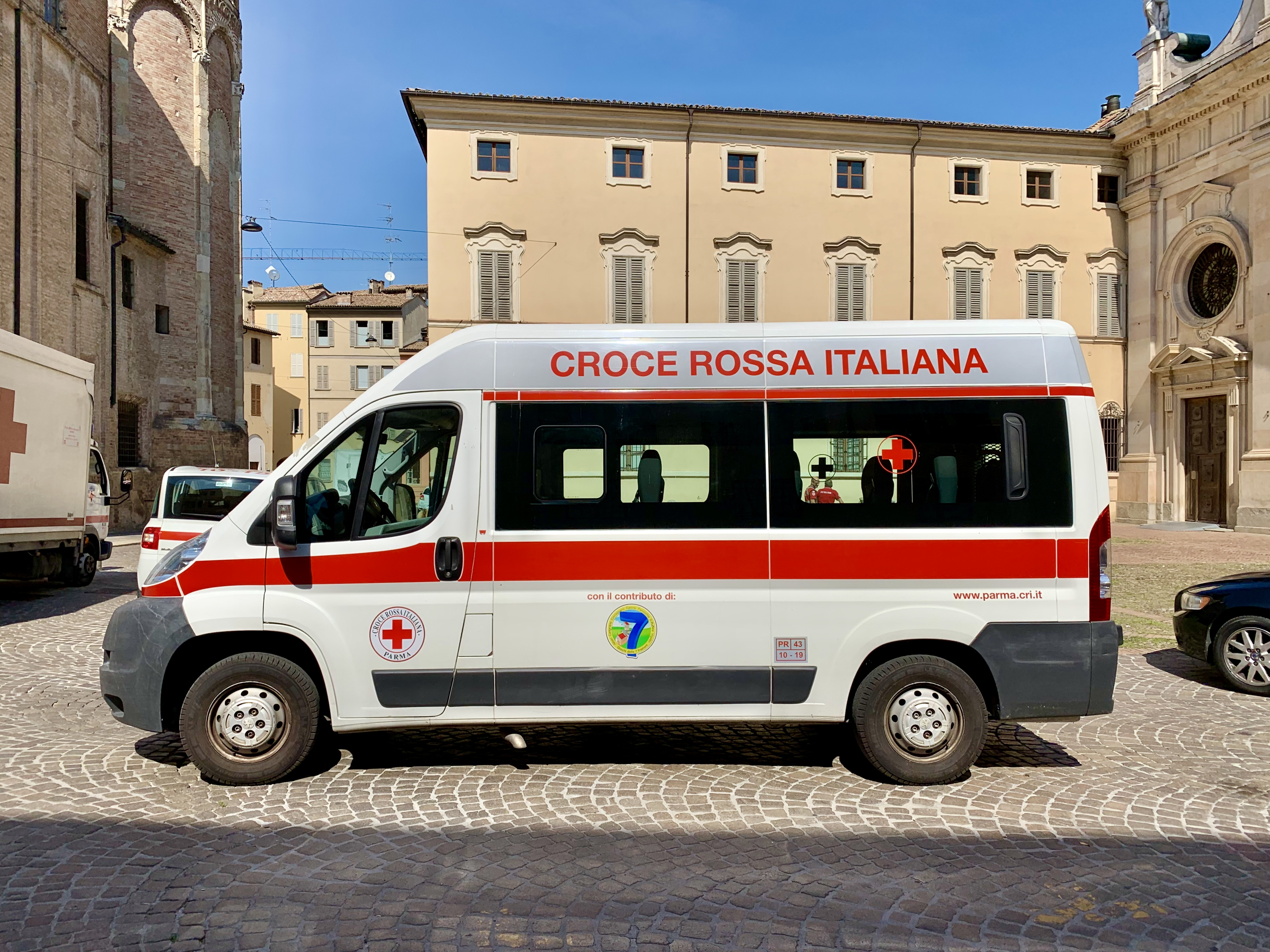
Van of the Italian Red Cross

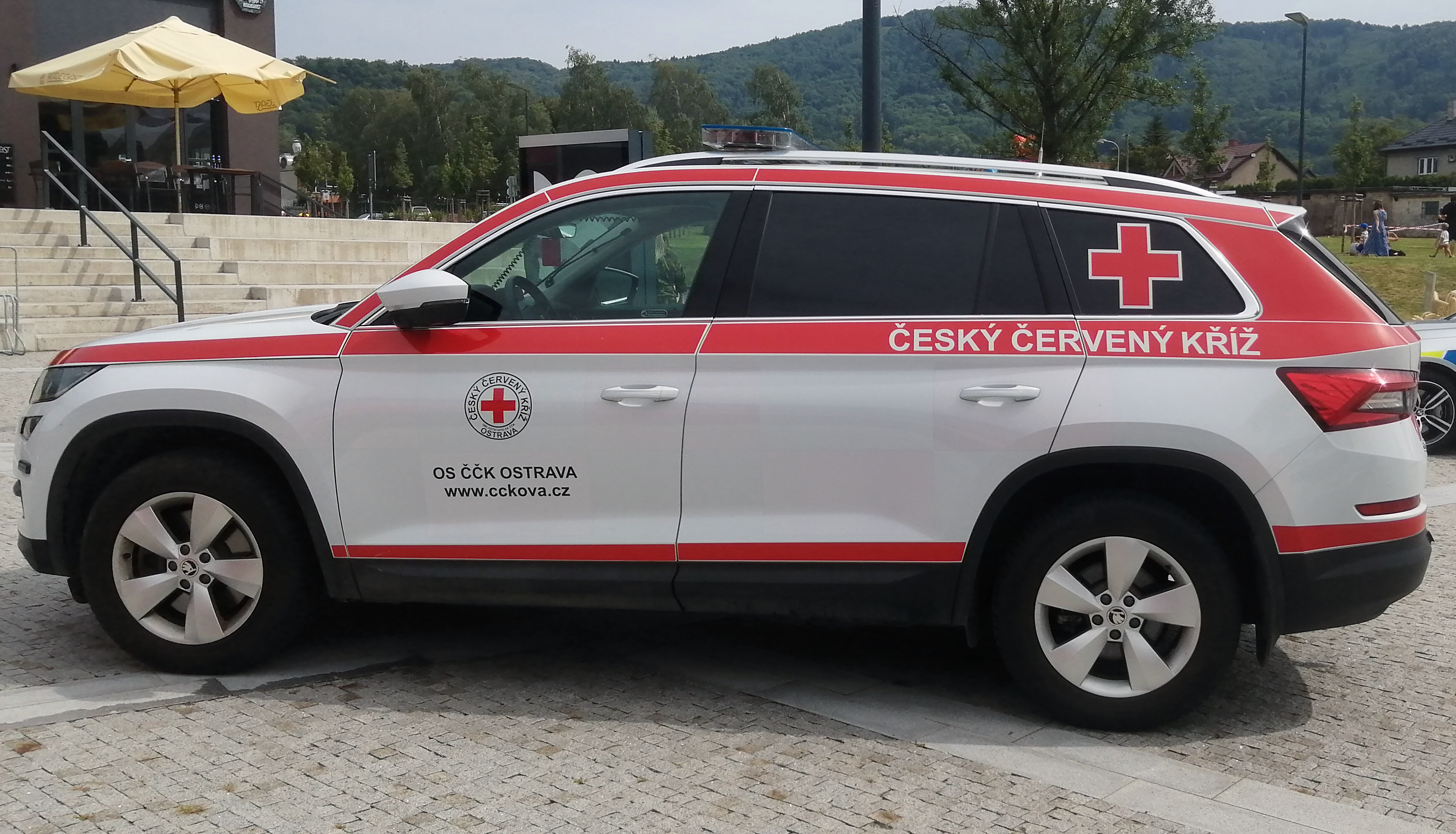
Doctor car of the Czech Red Cross (OS ČČK Ostrava)

The IFRC has its headquarters in Geneva. It also runs five zone offices (Africa, Americas, Asia Pacific, Europe, Middle East-North Africa), 14 permanent regional offices, and has about 350 delegates in more than 60 delegations around the world. The legal basis for the work of the IFRC is its constitution. The executive body of the IFRC is a secretariat, led by a secretary general. The secretariat is supported by five divisions including "Programme Services", "Humanitarian values and humanitarian diplomacy", "National Society and Knowledge Development" and "Governance and Management Services".

The highest decision-making body of the IFRC is its General Assembly, which convenes every two years with delegates from all of the national societies. Among other tasks, the General Assembly elects the secretary general. Between the convening of General Assemblies, the Governing Board is the leading body of the IFRC and has the authority to make decisions for the IFRC in a number of areas. The Governing Board consists of the president and the vice presidents of the IFRC, the chairpersons of the Finance and Youth Commissions, and twenty elected representatives from national societies.

The symbol of the IFRC is the combination of the Red Cross (left) and Red Crescent (right) on a white background surrounded by a red rectangular frame.

=== Funding and financial matters ===
The main parts of the IFRC's budget are funded by contributions from the national societies that are members of the IFRC and through revenues from its investments. The exact amount of contributions from each member society is established by the Finance Commission and approved by the General Assembly. Any additional funding, especially for unforeseen expenses for relief assistance missions, is raised by "appeals" published by the IFRC and comes for voluntary donations by national societies, governments, other organizations, corporations, and individuals.

== National societies ==
=== Official recognition ===
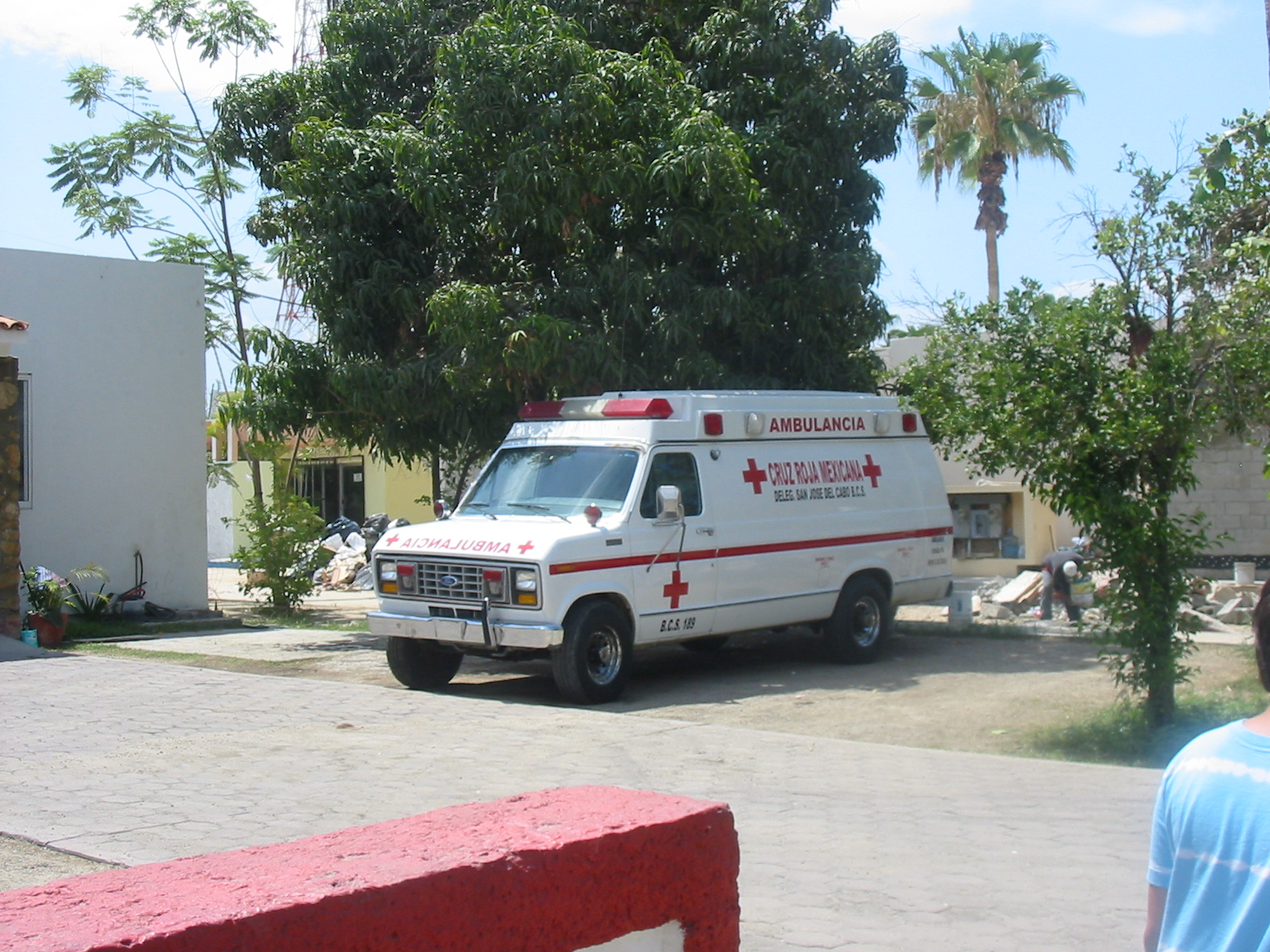
An ambulance owned by the Mexican Red Cross

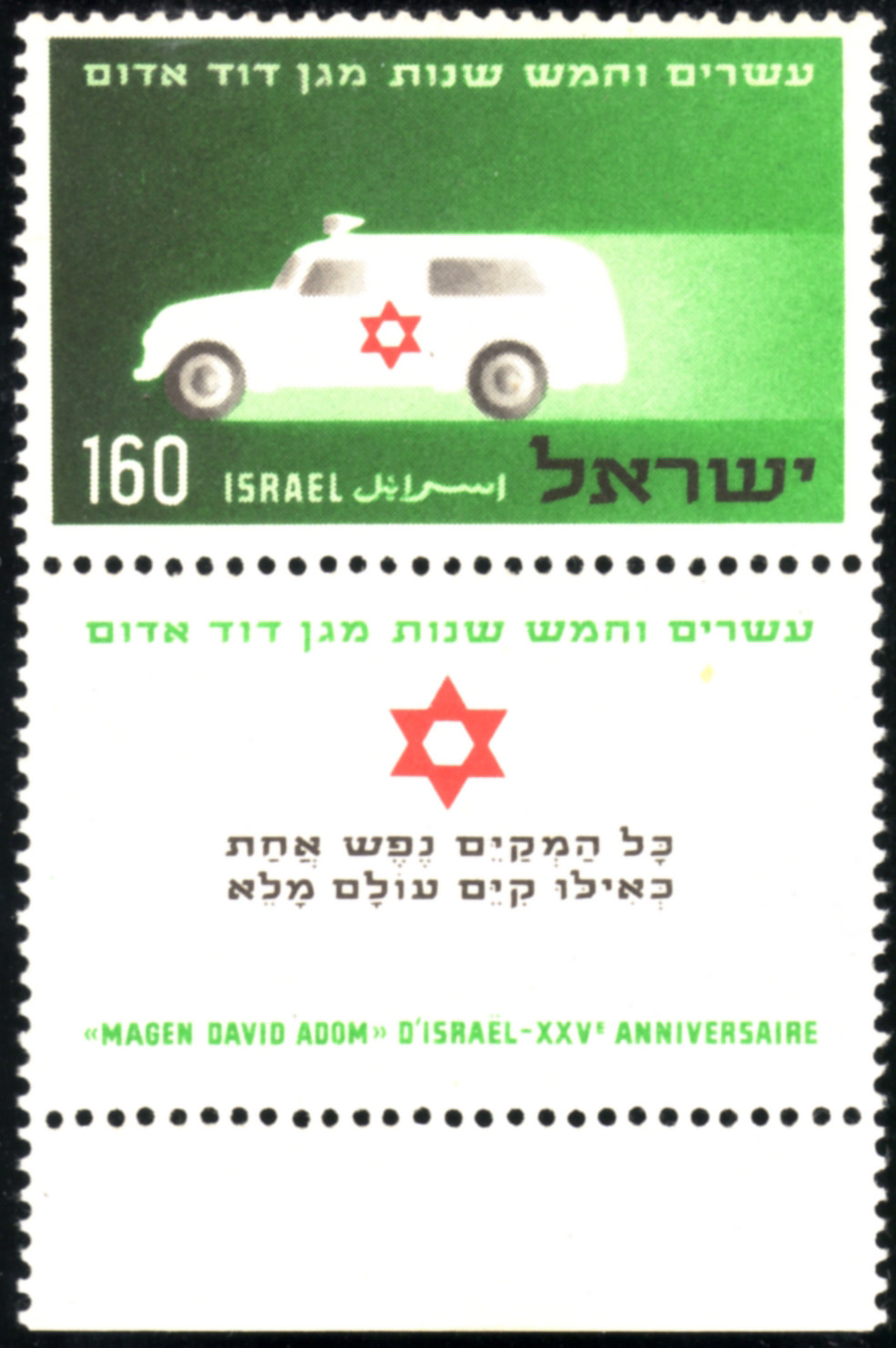
An Israeli stamp commemorating the 25th anniversary of Magen David Adom, issued 11 January, 1955

National Red Cross and Red Crescent societies exist in nearly every country in the world. Within their home country, they take on the duties and responsibilities of a national relief society as defined by International Humanitarian Law. Within the Movement, the ICRC is responsible for legally recognizing a relief society as an official national Red Cross or Red Crescent society. The exact rules for recognition are defined in the statutes of the Movement. Article 4 of these statutes contains the "Conditions for recognition of National Societies":

In order to be recognized in terms of Article 5, paragraph 2 b) as a National Society, the Society shall meet the following conditions:

1. Be constituted on the territory of an independent State where the Geneva Convention for the Amelioration of the Condition of the Wounded and Sick in Armed Forces in the Field is in force.
2. Be the only National Red Cross and-or Red Crescent Society of the said State and be directed by a central body which shall alone be competent to represent it in its dealings with other components of the Movement.
3. Be duly recognized by the legal government of its country on the basis of the Geneva Conventions and of the national legislation as a voluntary aid society, auxiliary to the public authorities in the humanitarian field.
4. Have an autonomous status which allows it to operate in conformity with the Fundamental Principles of the Movement.
5. Use the name and emblem of the Red Cross or Red Crescent in conformity with the Geneva Conventions.
6. Be so organized as to be able to fulfill the tasks defined in its own statutes, including the preparation in peace time for its statutory tasks in case of armed conflict.
7. Extend its activities to the entire territory of the State.
8. Recruit its voluntary members and its staff without consideration of race, sex, class, religion or political opinions.
9. Adhere to the present Statutes, share in the fellowship which unites the components of the Movement and co-operate with them.
10. Respect the Fundamental Principles of the Movement and be guided in its work by the principles of international humanitarian law.

Once a National Society has been recognized by the ICRC as a component of the International Red Cross and Red Crescent Movement (the Movement), it is in principle admitted to the International Federation of Red Cross and Red Crescent Societies in accordance with the terms defined in the Constitution and Rules of Procedure of the International Federation.

Today, there are 191 National Societies recognized within the Movement and which are members of the International Federation.

The most recent National Societies to have been recognized within the Movement are the Maldives Red Crescent Society (9 November, 2011), the South Sudan Red Cross Society (12 November, 2013), the Marshall Islands Red Cross Society (26 November, 2013), the Tuvalu Red Cross Society (on 1 March, 2016), and the Bhutan Red Cross Society (8 May, 2017).

=== Activities ===
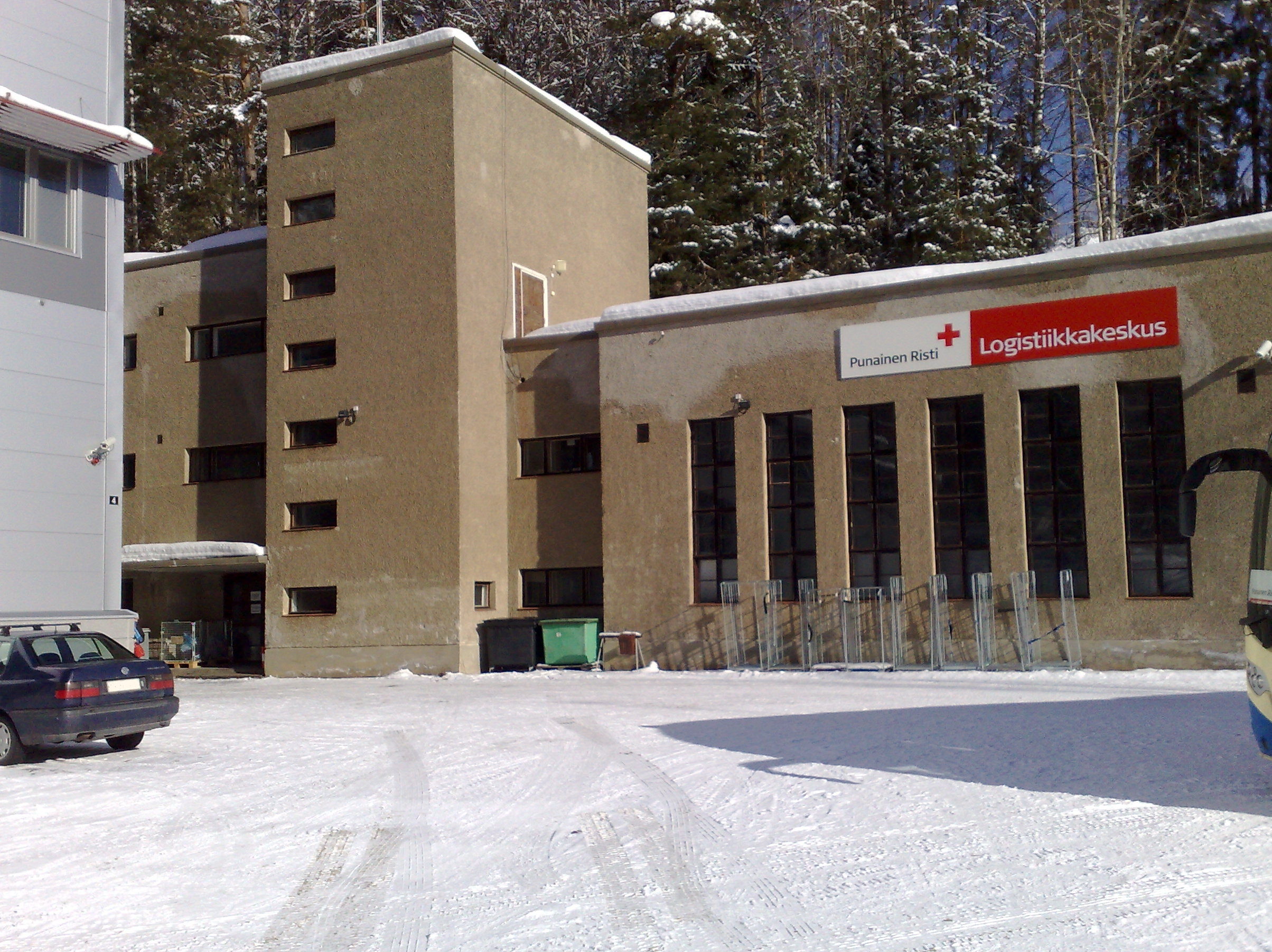
The Logistics Centre of the Finnish Red Cross in Tampere, Finland

Despite formal independence regarding organizational structure and work, each national society is still bound by the laws of its home country. In many countries, national Red Cross and Red Crescent societies enjoy exceptional privileges due to agreements with their governments or specific "Red Cross Laws" granting full independence as required by the International Movement. The duties and responsibilities of a national society as defined by International Humanitarian Law and the statutes of the Movement include the provision of humanitarian aid in armed conflicts and emergency crises such as natural disasters, through activities such as Restoring Family Links.

In a recent example of a national society's activities, the Russian Red Cross supported the organisation Myvmeste, which supports the Russian Army in the invasion of Ukraine with their "Everything for victory" fund.

Depending on their respective human, technical, financial, and organizational resources, many national societies take on additional humanitarian tasks within their home countries, such as blood donation services or acting as civilian Emergency Medical Service (EMS) providers. The ICRC and the International Federation cooperate with the national societies in their international missions, especially with human, material, and financial resources and organizing on-site logistics.

== History of the emblems ==
The Red Cross, Red Crescent, and Red Crystal emblems are officially recognized by the Movement. The Red Lion and Sun emblem is also an official emblem, though it has fallen into disuse. Various other countries have also lobbied for alternative symbols, which have been rejected because of concerns of territorialism.

=== Red Cross ===
Red Cross

The Red Cross emblem was officially approved in Geneva in 1863.

The Red Cross flag is not to be confused with the Saint George's Cross depicted on the flags of England, Barcelona, Georgia, Freiburg im Breisgau, and several other places. In order to avoid this confusion, the protected symbol is sometimes referred to as the "Greek Red Cross"; that term is also used in United States law to describe the Red Cross. The red cross of the Saint George cross extends to the edge of the flag, whereas the cross on the Red Cross flag does not.

In 1906, to put an end to the argument of the Ottoman Empire that the flag took its roots from Christianity, it was decided officially to promote the idea that the Red Cross flag had been formed by reversing the colours of the flag of Switzerland, in recognition of "the pioneering work of Swiss citizens in establishing internationally recognized standards for the protection of wounded combatants and military medical facilities". However, no written evidence of this origin had ever been found.

The 1899 convention signed at the Hague extended the use of the Red Cross flag to naval ensigns, requiring that "all hospital ships shall make themselves known by hoisting, together with their national flag, the white flag with a red cross provided by the Geneva Convention".

=== Red Crescent ===
Red Crescent

The Red Crescent emblem was first used by ICRC volunteers during the armed conflict of 1876–1878 between the Ottoman Empire and the Russian Empire. The symbol was officially adopted in 1929, and so far 33 states in the Muslim world have recognized it. In common with the official promotion of the red cross symbol as a colour-reversal of the Swiss flag (rather than a religious symbol), the red crescent is similarly presented as being derived from a colour-reversal of the flag of the Ottoman Empire.

=== Red Crystal ===
Red Crystal

The International Committee of the Red Cross (ICRC) was concerned with the possibility that the two previous symbols (Red Cross and Red Crescent) were conveying religious meanings which would not be compatible with, for example, a majority Hindu, Buddhist, or Shinto country from the Asia-Pacific region, where the majority did not associate with the symbols of Christianity or Islam. Therefore, in 1992, the then-president Cornelio Sommaruga decided that a third, more neutral symbol was required.

On 8 December, 2005, in response to growing pressure to accommodate Magen David Adom (MDA), Israel's national emergency medical, disaster, ambulance, and blood bank service, as a full member of the Red Cross and Red Crescent movement, a new emblem (officially the Third Protocol Emblem, but more commonly known as the Red Crystal) was adopted by an amendment of the Geneva Conventions known as Protocol III, fulfilling Sommaruga's suggestion.

The Crystal can be found on official buildings and occasionally in the field. This symbolises equality and has no political, religious, or geographical connotations, thus allowing any country not comfortable with the symbolism of the original two flags to join the movement.

=== Red Lion and Sun ===
Red Lion and Sun

The Red Lion and Sun Society of Iran was established in 1922 and admitted to the Red Cross and Red Crescent movement in 1923. The symbol was introduced at Geneva in 1864, as a counter example to the crescent and cross used by two of Iran's rivals, the Ottoman and the Russian empires. Although that claim is inconsistent with the Red Crescent's history, that history also suggests that the Red Lion and Sun, like the Red Crescent, may have been conceived during the 1877–1878 war between Russia and Turkey.

Due to the emblem's association with the Iranian monarchy, the Islamic Republic of Iran replaced the Red Lion and Sun with the Red Crescent in 1980, consistent with two existing Red Cross and Red Crescent symbols. Although the Red Lion and Sun has now fallen into disuse, Iran has in the past reserved the right to take it up again at any time; the Geneva Conventions continue to recognize it as an official emblem, and that status was confirmed by Protocol III in 2005, even as it added the Red Crystal.

=== Unrecognized emblems ===
==== Red Star of David ====
Magen David Adom, or Red Star of David

For over 50 years, the State of Israel requested the addition of a red Star of David, arguing that since Christian and Muslim emblems were recognized, a corresponding Jewish emblem should be as well, despite the Red Cross and Red Crescent symbols being used outside of a religious context. The Red Star of David emblem has been used by Magen David Adom (MDA), or Red Star of David, but it is not recognized by the Geneva Conventions as a protected symbol. Although the emblem is not recognized outside Israel, the MDA uses the Red Crystal emblem during international operations in order to ensure protection. Depending on the circumstances, it may place the Red Star of David inside the Red Crystal, or use the Red Crystal alone.

In her March 2000 letter to the International Herald Tribune and the New York Times, Bernadine Healy, then president of the American Red Cross, wrote: "The international committee's feared proliferation of symbols is a pitiful fig leaf, used for decades as the reason for excluding the Magen David Adom—the Shield (or Star) of David." In protest, the American Red Cross withheld millions in administrative funding to the International Federation of Red Cross and Red Crescent Societies since May 2000.

==== Red Swastika ====
Red Swastika

In 1922, a Red Swastika Society was formed in China during the Warlord Era. The swastika is used in the Indian subcontinent, East and Southeast Asia as a symbol to represent Dharma or Hinduism, Buddhism, and Jainism in general. While the organization has organized philanthropic relief projects (both domestic and international), as a sectarian religious body it is ineligible for recognition from the International Committee.

== Hostage crisis allegations ==
In 1999, the Australian TV network ABC Television and European human rights organization Rettet die Naturvölker released a documentary titled Blood on the Cross. The documentary alleged that the Red Cross supplied a white helicopter to the Indonesian National Armed Forces (TNI) in May 1996 for a TNI operation to resolve the Mapenduma hostage crisis, which saw 26 World Wildlife Fund employees being held as hostages by the separatist Free Papua Movement (OPM).

Following the broadcast of Blood on the Cross, the Red Cross publicly announced it would appoint an individual outside the organization to investigate the allegations made in the documentary and any responsibility on the Red Cross' part. Polish investigator Piotr Obuchowicz was subsequently appointed to investigate the documentary's allegations. His final report stated there was no evidence that the Red Cross personnel accused of involvement in the TNI operation by Blood on the Cross were present in the area at the time. It also stated that a white helicopter was probably used by the Indonesian military to rescue the hostages, but the helicopter was not affiliated with the Red Cross and must have been painted by one of several military forces operating in the region at the time. The report stated it was possible the Red Cross logo itself was also painted onto the helicopter, although there was no conclusive evidence for this claim. Obuchowicz ended his report by noting that a white helicopter with Red Cross markings was part of the TNI operation to free the hostages, but was clearly intended to achieve surprise by deceiving the OPM into thinking that a Red Cross helicopter was landing, and that the Red Cross should have responded more quickly and thoroughly to investigate the allegations.

== See also ==
- Emblems of the International Red Cross and Red Crescent Movement
- First Aid Convention Europe
- List of National Red Cross and Red Crescent Societies
- World Red Cross and Red Crescent Day

== Bibliography ==
- Bennett, Angela (2006). The Geneva Convention. The Hidden Origins of the Red Cross. Gloucestershire: The History Press. ISBN 978-0752495828.
- Boissier, Pierre (1985). From Solferino to Tsushima. Henry Durant Institute. ISBN 978-2-88044-012-1. Archived from the original on 4 October 2024.
- Boissier, Pierre. History of the International Committee of the Red Cross. Volume I: From Solferino to Tsushima. Henry Dunant Institute, Geneva, 1985. ISBN 2-88044-012-2
- Bugnion, François. The emblem of the Red Cross: a brief history. ICRC (ref. 0316), Geneva, 1977.
- Bugnion, François. The International Committee of the Red Cross and the Protection of War Victims. ICRC & Macmillan (ref. 0503), Geneva, 2003. ISBN 0-333-74771-2
- Bugnion, François. Towards a comprehensive Solution to the Question of the Emblem. Revised 4th edition. ICRC (ref. 0778), Geneva, 2006.
- Dawidowicz, Lucy S. (1975). "Bleaching the Black Lie: The Case of Theresienstadt". Salmagundi (29): 125–140. JSTOR 40546857.
- De Saxe, Morris (1929). South African Jewish Year Book. South African Jewish Historical Society. Archived from the original on 4 October 2024.
- Dromi, Shai M. (2020). Above the fray: The Red Cross and the making of the humanitarian NGO sector. Chicago: Univ. of Chicago Press. ISBN 978-0-2266-8010-1. Archived from the original on 29 October 2020.
- Dromi, Shai M. (2016). "For good and country: nationalism and the diffusion of humanitarianism in the late nineteenth century". The Sociological Review. 64 (2): 79–97. doi:10.1002/2059-7932.12003.
- Dunant, Jean-Henri (1863). Compte rendu de la Conférence internationale réunie à Genève les 26, 27, 28 et 29 octobre 1863 pour étudier les moyens de pourvoir à l'insuffisance du service sanitaire dans les armées en campagne [Report of the International Conference meeting in Geneva on 26, 27, 28 and 29 October 1863 to study the means of providing for the insufficiency of the medical service in the Armies in the field] (PDF) (in French). Geneva: Jules-Guillaume Fick. Archived (PDF) from the original on 24 July 2021.
- Dunant, Henry. A Memory of Solferino. ICRC, Geneva 1986. ISBN 2-88145-006-7
- Durand, André. History of the International Committee of the Red Cross. Volume II: From Sarajevo to Hiroshima. Henry Dunant Institute, Geneva, 1984. ISBN 2-88044-009-2
- Farmborough, Florence. With the Armies of the Tsar: A Nurse at the Russian Front 1914–1918. Stein and Day, New York, 1975. ISBN 0-8128-1793-1
- Farré, Sébastien; Schubert, Yan (2009). "L'illusion de l'objectif" [The Illusion of the Objective]. Le Mouvement Social (in French). 227 (2): 65–83. doi:10.3917/lms.227.0065. S2CID 144792195. Archived from the original on 28 May 2023.
- Favez, Jean-Claude. The Red Cross and the Holocaust, Cambridge University Press, 1999.
- Forsythe, David P. Humanitarian Politics: The International Committee of the Red Cross. Johns Hopkins University Press, Baltimore 1978. ISBN 0-8018-1983-0
- Forsythe, David P. The Humanitarians: The International Committee of the Red Cross. Cambridge University Press, Cambridge 2005. ISBN 0-521-61281-0
- Forsythe, David P. "The International Committee of the Red Cross and International Humanitarian Law." In: Humanitäres Völkerrecht – Informationsschriften. The Journal of International Law of Peace and Armed Conflict. 2/2003, German Red Cross and Institute for International Law of Peace and Armed Conflict, p. 64–77. ISSN 0937-5414
- Haug, Hans. Humanity for All: The International Red Cross and Red Crescent Movement. Henry Dunant Institute, Geneva in association with Paul Haupt Publishers, Bern, 1993. ISBN 3-258-04719-7
- Handbook of the International Red Cross and Red Crescent Movement. 13th edition, International Committee of the Red Cross, Geneva, 1994. ISBN 2-88145-074-1
- Hutchinson, John F. Champions of Charity: War and the Rise of the Red Cross. Westview Press, Boulder, Colorado, 1997. ISBN 0-8133-3367-9
- Leith, Denise (2002). The politics of power: Freeport in Suharto's Indonesia. University of Hawaii Press. ISBN 978-0-8248-2566-9.
- Lavoyer, Jean-Philippe; Maresca, Louis. The Role of the ICRC in the Development of International Humanitarian Law. In: International Negotiation. 4(3)/1999. Brill Academic Publishers, pp. 503–527. ISSN 1382-340X
- Moorehead, Caroline. Dunant's Dream: War, Switzerland and the History of the Red Cross. HarperCollins, London, 1998. ISBN 0-00-255141-1 (Hardcover edition); HarperCollins, London 1999, ISBN 0-00-638883-3 (Paperback edition)
- Möller, Esther (2020), Red Cross and Red Crescent Archived 4 October 2024 at the Wayback Machine, EGO - European History Online Archived 8 February 2013 at the Wayback Machine, Mainz: Institute of European History Archived 19 February 2016 at the Wayback Machine, retrieved: 17 March 2021.
- Rothkirchen, Livia (2006). The Jews of Bohemia and Moravia: Facing the Holocaust. Lincoln: University of Nebraska Press. ISBN 978-0-8032-0502-4.
- Sending, Ole Jacob; Pouliot, Vincent; Neumann, Iver B. (20 August 2015). Diplomacy and the Making of World Politics. Cambridge University Press. ISBN 978-1-316-36878-7.
- Schazmann, Paul-Emile (1955). "Romain Rolland et la Croix-Rouge: Romain Rolland, Collaborateur de l'Agence internationale des prisonniers de guerre" (PDF). International Review of the Red Cross (in French). 37 (434): 140. doi:10.1017/S1026881200125735. S2CID 144703916. Archived from the original on 23 April 2021.
- Stefon, Matt (2011). Christianity: History, Belief, and Practice. The Rosen Publishing Group. ISBN 978-1-61530-493-6.
- Telò, Mario (2014). Globalisation, Multilateralism, Europe: Towards a Better Global Governance?. London: Routledge. ISBN 978-1-4094-6449-5.
- Walters, William C. (2004). An assessment of the capacity of the Red Cross National Societies to address the psychological and social needs of survivors of disasters and complex emergencies in Central and South America (Thesis). Waterloo, Ontario. ISBN 0-612-96599-6.
- Willemin, Georges; Heacock, Roger. International Organization and the Evolution of World Society. Volume 2: The International Committee of the Red Cross. Martinus Nijhoff Publishers, Boston, 1984. ISBN 90-247-3064-3
- Wylie, Neville. The Sound of Silence: The History of the International Committee of the Red Cross as Past and Present. In: Diplomacy and Statecraft. 13(4)/2002. Routledge/ Taylor & Francis, pp. 186–204, ISSN 0959-2296
- Young, John; Hoyland, Greg (14 July 2016). Christianity: A Complete Introduction. Hodder & Stoughton. ISBN 978-1-4736-1577-9.
- Zweig, Stefan (1921). Romain Rolland; the man and his work. Translated by Eden, Paul; Cedar, Paul. New York: T. Seltzer.
