= Big Valley Pictures =

American film production company

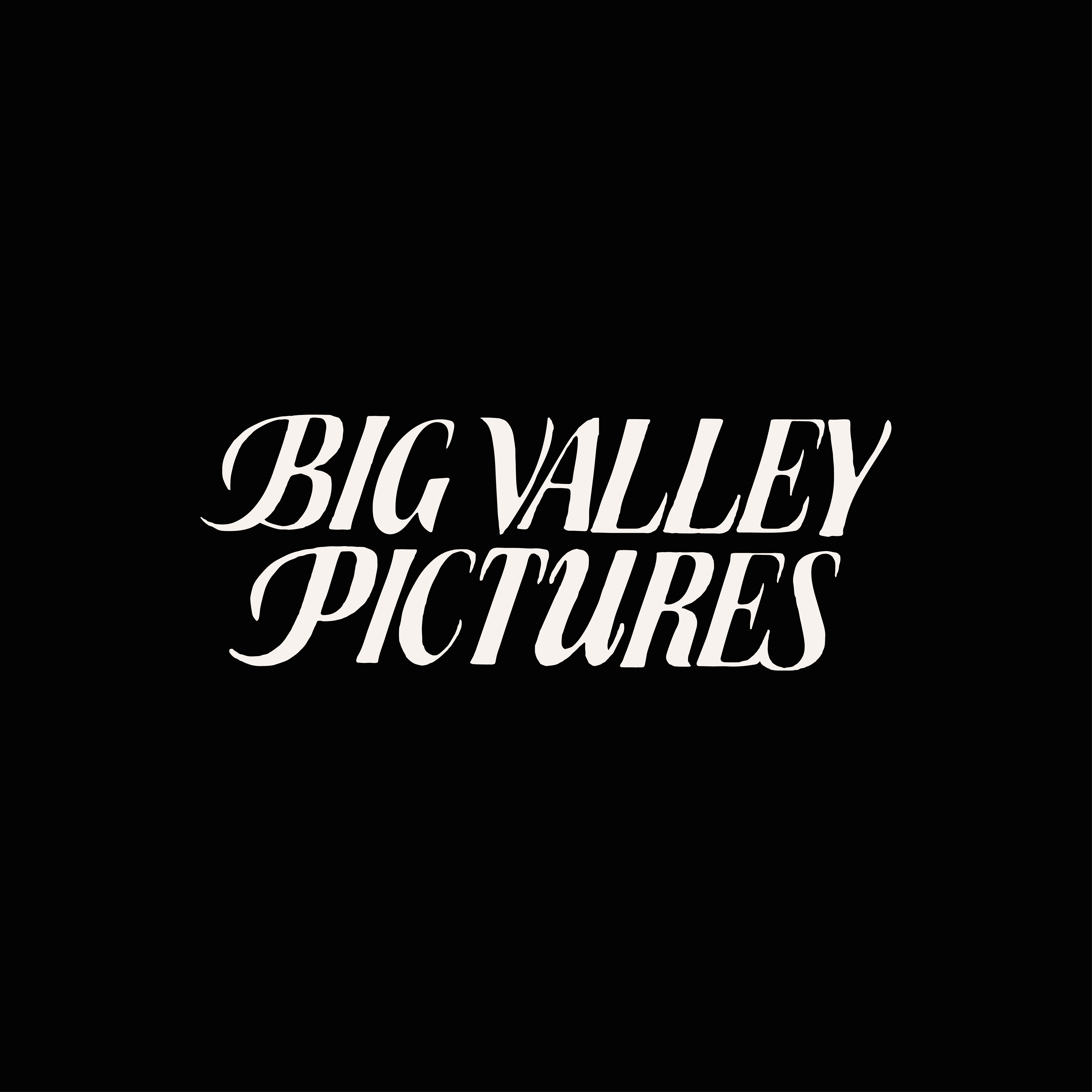
- Company type: Private
- Industry: Production company
- Founded: 2010; 16 years ago in Los Angeles, California, U.S.
- Founder: Alex Prager
- Headquarters: Los Angeles, California, U.S.
- Website: bigvalleypictures.com

Big Valley Pictures is an American independent film production company founded by director, screenwriter and artist Alex Prager in 2010. Its headquarters are located in Los Angeles, California.

The company's first feature film production, DreamQuil starring Elizabeth Banks and John C. Reilly, is set to be released in 2027 by Republic Pictures. The film had its world premiere at SXSW Film & TV Festival in March 2026.

== History ==
In 2010, Alex Prager started Big Valley Pictures to produce independent films. The company's first film, Despair (2010) had its premiere at the Museum of Modern Art in New York.

Since its inception, Big Valley Pictures has produced 9 short films and in 2027 will release their first feature, DreamQuil alongside HanWay Films, Patriot Pictures, Brownstone Productions, and Landay Entertainment. Their films are crafted with meticulous attention to detail, drawing from the traditions of classic cinema with a timeless sensibility.

On May 11th, 2023, it was announced that Prager would write and direct her directorial debut feature film DreamQuil starring Elizabeth Banks and John C. Reilly, co-written by her sister Vanessa Prager. In May 2024, Juliette Lewis signed onto the project.

The company is named after one of Prager's early art series The Big Valley (2008), exhibited in London at the Michael Hoppen Gallery.

== Filmography ==
=== Films ===
Year	Title	Notes	Ref.
2010	Despair		
2012	La Petite Mort		
2012	Sunday		
2013	Face in the Crowd		
2015	La Grande Sortie	with Paris Opera and Slow Dance	
2018	Uncanny Valley		
2019	Play the Wind		
2021	Part One: The Mountain Interviews		
2022	Run		

==== Upcoming ====
- DreamQuil (with Brownstone Productions, HanWay Films, Patriot Pictures, and Landay Entertainment)
