= DreamQuil =

2026 thriller film by Alex Prager

- Theatrical release poster
- Directed by: Alex Prager
- Written by: Alex Prager; Vanessa Prager
- Produced by: Natalie Perrotta; Scott Putman; Matt Aselton; Marc Marrie; Mal Ward; Elizabeth Banks; Max Handelman; Vincent Landay; Alex Prager; Alison Small; Michael Mendelsohn
- Starring: Elizabeth Banks; John C. Reilly; Sofia Boutella; Juliette Lewis; Kathryn Newton
- Cinematography: Lol Crawley
- Edited by: Matt Chessé; Brad Besser; Jennifer Chung
- Music by: Ali Helnwein
- Production companies: Patriot Pictures; Landay Entertainment; Brownstone Productions; Arts & Sciences; Big Valley Pictures
- Distributed by: Republic Pictures (United States and Canada); Signature Entertainment (United Kingdom); HanWay Films (International)
- Release dates: March 16, 2026 (SXSW); October 16, 2026 (United States)
- Running time: 84 minutes
- Countries: United Kingdom; United States
- Language: English

DreamQuil is a 2026 psychological thriller film starring John C. Reilly and Elizabeth Banks and co-written, produced and directed by Alex Prager in her feature length debut.

The film had its world premiere at SXSW Film & TV Festival on March 16, 2026. It was released in the United States on October 16, 2026.

== Premise ==
Set in the near future, a woman embarks on a virtual wellness retreat in order to get her life back on track – but with nightmarish consequences.

== Cast ==
- John C. Reilly as Gary
- Elizabeth Banks as Carol and her artificial replacement, Carol 2
- Juliette Lewis as Nurse Chapman
- Kathryn Newton as Margo Case
- Sofia Boutella as Rebecca
- Lamorne Morris

== Production ==
Patriot Pictures produced the film alongside Arts & Sciences, Elizabeth Banks, Max Handelman and Alison Small for Brownstone Productions, Vincent Landay (Landay Entertainment) and Alex Prager (Big Valley Pictures). The film, for which Prager co-wrote the script with her sister Vanessa, marks Prager's feature debut.

Filming was delayed by the 2023 SAG-AFTRA strike. In May 2024, just as filming commenced in Los Angeles, Republic Pictures pre-emptively acquired North American distribution rights to the film, with financier HanWay Films handling international sales. Later that month, it was announced that Juliette Lewis, Kathryn Newton, and Sofia Boutella had joined the cast. Lol Crawley served as the cinematographer, while Matt Cheesé and Brad Besser edited the film.

== Reception ==
On the review aggregator website Rotten Tomatoes, the film holds an approval rating of 39%, based on 18 reviews, with an average rating of 5.2/10.
