= Alex Prager =

American photographer and filmmaker (born 1979)

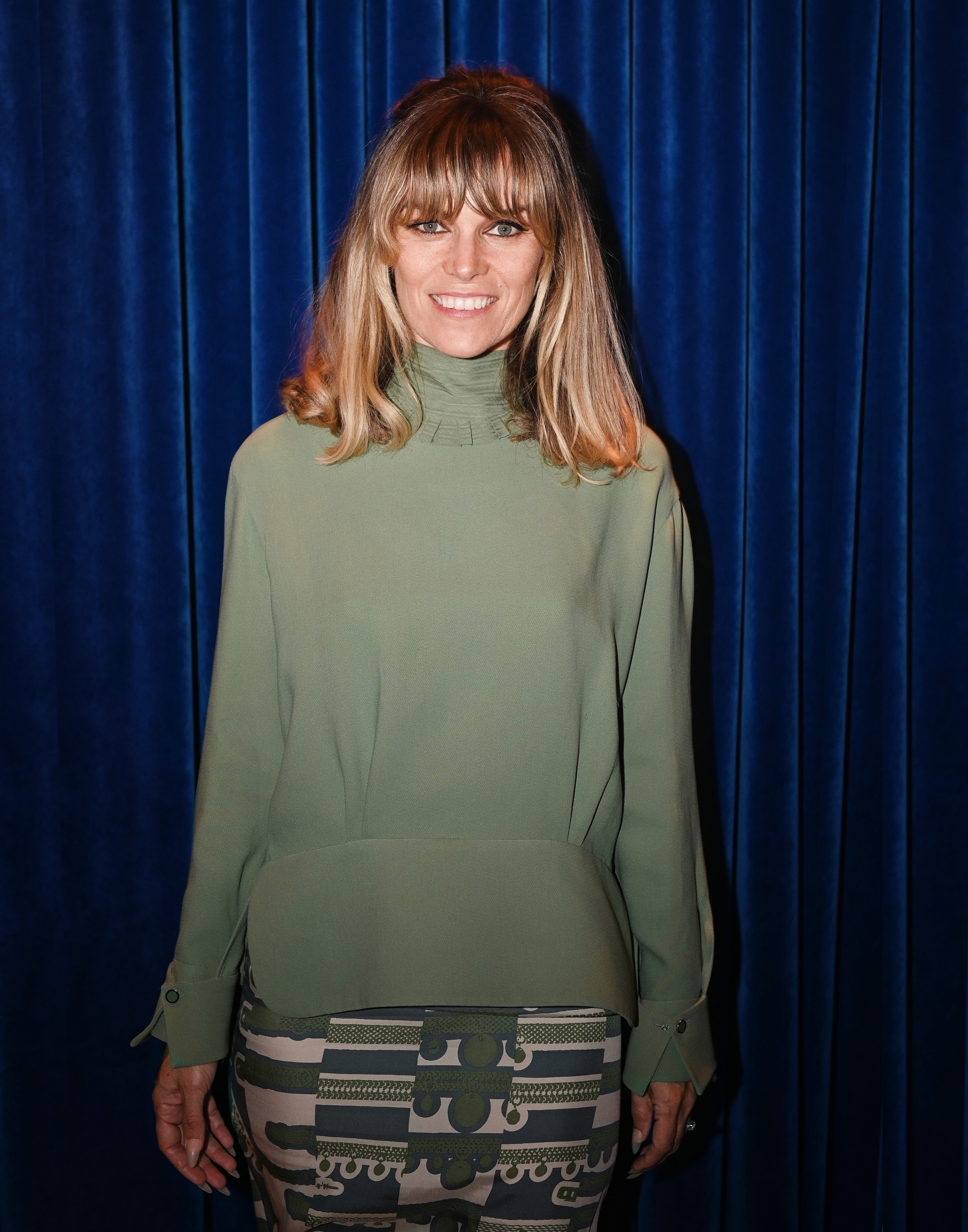
- Prager in 2023
- Born: November 1, 1979 (age 47); Los Angeles, California, U.S.
- Known for: Photography, Filmmaking
- Awards: News and Documentary Emmy Award for New Approaches to News & Documentary Programming: Arts, Lifestyle & Culture – Emmy Awards 2012 Touch of Evil; Foam Paul Huf Award – Foam Fotografiemuseum Amsterdam 2012 Compulsion
- Website: www.alexprager.com

Alex Prager (born November 1, 1979) is an American artist, director, and screenwriter based in Los Angeles.

Prager is best known for making large-scale photographic works that distort the boundaries between reality and artifice, often centered around the human condition. Her photographs and first short film were included in MoMA's New Photography 2010 exhibition and in 2023, Prager was named one of the "25 New Faces of Independent Film."

== Early life ==
Prager was born in Los Feliz, Los Angeles. At age fourteen, she dropped out of school and traveled to Switzerland on her own, where she worked at a knife store in Lucerne. She returned to Switzerland frequently for longer periods of time and earned her G.E.D at sixteen.

When she was twenty-one and living in Los Angeles, Prager was inspired to pursue photography after seeing an exhibition of William Eggleston's photographs at the Getty Museum. She cites this as a formative experience: "I felt like I was struck blind by a vision and that was the path I was going to take for the rest of my life." A self-taught artist, Prager avoided formal art education and instead purchased a Nikon N90s camera and printed photographs in a home darkroom.

== Artwork ==
Prager's work is characterized by distinctive mise-en-scène, ambiguous and open-ended narratives, highly staged scenes, unique characters, timeless costumes, and saturated colors. Her work is notably influenced by golden-era period styles like film noir and Technicolor, mythology, and works by Dutch Renaissance painters.

Prager uses symbolism, humor, allegory, and surreal elements, as well as formal and conceptual techniques, to evoke a psychological response and explore the human experience. She has said that she approaches each project as a reflection of her personal questions and those of greater society.

Employing traditional filmmaking techniques, effects, and large-scale productions, Prager often constructs complex scenes with elaborate characters and saturated, commonplace settings. She uses costuming to define her characters and expand her narratives, pulling from her extensive wardrobe collection.

During the pre-production process, Prager meticulously plans every element to allow for the unknown and chaos to unfold in a controlled environment. All elements of the images are practical and shot in-camera, and she has said "it's important [to her] that you could theoretically touch anything you see in the frame."

=== Early work ===
Prager's early series, Polyester (2007), The Big Valley (2008), and Week-End (2009), are defined by portraits featuring female protagonists against a Los Angeles backdrop.

=== Career ===
In 2008, Prager transitioned into filmmaking after her exhibition The Big Valley in London, a defining moment for the artist.

Prager's first short film, "Despair" (2010) starring Bryce Dallas Howard, was included in the New Photography 2010 exhibition at the Museum of Modern Art, alongside her photographs, which was a breakthrough in her career. The Curator of Photography at MoMA, Roxana Marcoci, described Prager's work as "intentionally loaded", saying "it reminds me of silent movies— there is something pregnant, about to happen, a mix of desire and angst."

In 2011, Kathy Ryan, Director of Photography for The New York Times Magazine, commissioned Prager to shoot twelve 1-minute films inspired by "cinematic villainy", with some film actors from that year. Prager won a News and Documentary Emmy Award for New Approaches to News & Documentary Programming: Arts, Lifestyle & Culture for her "Touch of Evil "short films.

With her 2012 series of diptychs, Compulsion, Prager addressed themes of disaster, observation, compulsive spectatorship, and how the meanings of images are derived from a multiplicity of gazes. Her short film "La Petite Mort," starring French actress Judith Godreche with narration from Gary Oldman, was shown alongside the body of work. The film was a "contemplation on death" and "a way for [her] to deal with the hopelessness [she] was feeling about the world. Creating a parallel universe where tragedies happen but with a sense of lightness as well."

Prager's series, Face in the Crowd, debuted at Washington D.C.'s Corcoran Gallery of Art in 2013, marking her first solo museum exhibition in the U.S. The series of highly staged images of crowds in various familiar settings indicated a distinctive shift in the artist's practice. The new body of work connected familiar themes in her artwork, but also explored the contemporary condition of the individual and the crowd and human connection versus isolation. The exhibition included photographic work and a three-channel installation of the film (2013), featuring Elizabeth Banks.

She was commissioned by the Paris Opera in 2015 to create a film for 3e Scène, which also coincided with a series of photographs from the project. The film, "La Grande Sortie" portrays the perspectives of performer and audience and considers the underlying tension in this relationship. It features Émilie Cozette and Karl Paquette dancing to an adapted score by Nigel Godrich.

In 2018, Nathalie Herschdorfer, Director of Photo Elysée, curated a major exhibition marking the first mid-career survey of Prager's work. The exhibition traveled internationally to institutions including The Photographers' Gallery, Museum of Fine Arts Le Locle, Foam Fotografiemuseum, Fotografiska, Stockholm, among others.

In 2019, Prager completed and exhibited her most autobiographical body of work to date, which included photographs and a new short film, "Play the Wind" with Dimitri Chamblas and Riley Keough. The work is an homage to and reflection on the city of Los Angeles, Prager's hometown and a frequent source of inspiration throughout her career.

Prager is represented by the gallery Lehmann Maupin. Prager's work has been exhibited in numerous museum exhibitions globally, including the Museum of Modern Art, New York; Corcoran Gallery of Art, Washington, D.C.; The National Gallery of Victoria, Melbourne, Australia; Fotografiska, Stockholm, Sweden; and the Los Angeles County Museum of Art, CA, among others.

=== Recent work ===
Prager returned to portraiture in 2021 with Part One: The Mountain. Inspired to examine the complicated emotional effects of the COVID-19 pandemic, Prager created a more simple and intimate series of Americana portraits capturing her fictional subjects in the midst of intense inner turmoil.

Continuing to explore the anxiety and responses of living through uncertain times, Prager followed with a new short film starring Katherine Waterson and an accompanying series of images for Part Two: Run in 2022. The film, titled "Run" (2022), features the unfolding chaos of gigantic silver ball barreling through a small town to a soundtrack by Ellen Reid and Philip Glass.

In 2024, Prager debuted Western Mechanics, her first exhibition with Lehmann Maupin in Seoul. The new body of photographic work circumvented linear narrative and instead focused on the presentation of emotionally charged vignettes.

== Film ==
In 2010, Alex Prager started Big Valley Pictures to produce independent films.

Prager's films are often psychological thrillers touching on horror and characterized by depictions of isolation, fear, artifice, and the need for connection. Humor, entwined with the unsettling elements, plays an important role in her work.

She is noted for her regular collaborations with cinematographer Matthew Libatique and has collaborated with actors Cate Blanchett, Brad Pitt, Elizabeth Banks, Gary Oldman, Riley Keough, Michael Shannon, Jessica Chastain, George Clooney, Ryan Gosling, Kirsten Dunst, Glenn Close, Rooney Mara, and Viola Davis, among others.

Prager's short film Face in the Crowd (2013) screened at the New Directors/New Films festival at Lincoln Center and MoMA in 2014. Her most recent short film, "Run" (2022), premiered at the Santa Barbara Film Festival and was nominated for the 2023 SXSW Grand Jury Award. In 2023, she was named one of the "25 New Faces of Independent Film" by Filmmaker Magazine.

Prager's debut feature film DreamQuil—described as a cautionary tale about identity, automation, and what makes us human set in the near distant future—had its world premiere at SXSW Film & TV Festival in March 2026. The film stars Elizabeth Banks and John C. Reilly.

== Commercial work ==
Prager has been commissioned to shoot features and campaigns by luxury brands and prominent publications such as Vogue, New York Magazine, The New York Times Magazine, W Magazine, Garage, Bottega Veneta, Dior, Hermés, Tiffany, and Lavazza.

She has also directed commercials for several prominent international brands including Apple, Hermés, Miller, Anheuser-Busch, Vimeo, and most recently, Cartier, featuring Elle Fanning, in 2023.

== Reception ==
Prager's work is often discussed in connection to Los Angeles. Emily Witt, a journalist and staff writer for The New Yorker, wrote "Prager does for photography what James Ellroy did for crime fiction, inventing a neo-noir L.A. vernacular that creates a feeling of the past without the limitations of historical accuracy."

Michael Govan, the director of Los Angeles County Museum of Art has said that

Prager's photographic and filmic compositions, like Eggleston's photographs, Alfred Hitchcock's films, and Edward Hopper's paintings, reveal the extraordinary lurking within the ordinary. Wreaking havoc with our involuntary voyeurism and our tendency to leap to conclusions about people's characters based on the merest details of their appearances, Prager cues our own fantasies by representing her own.

Michael Mansfield, the former Curator for Film and Media Art at the Smithsonian American Art Museum, regarded:

Prager belongs to a generation of contemporary artists who fully own their media. She wields a camera and a director's chair with equal strength, and creates both motion pictures and photographs in full view of their commercial influences and the complex politics of art-house avant-garde cinema.

Prager's crowd photographs are among her most well-known and lauded. Art historian and curator William J Simmons wrote

We might then connect Prager's crowds to democratic studies of class and labor, like August Sander's Face of our Time (1929) and Irving Penn's Small Trades (1950–51) . . . Prager's contemporary crowds, filled with markers of class, gender, occupation, and privilege (or lack thereof), absorb and require us to consider the very real ramifications of collectivity and estrangement.

== Publications ==
- Polyester, Alex Prager Studio. 2007. ASIN B001IYHQAE.
- The Big Valley / Week-end, M+B and Yancey Richardson Gallery. 2010. ISBN 0615339182.
- Compulsion, Michael Hoppen Gallery. 2012. ISBN 0615613055.
- Face in the Crowd, Corcoran. 2013. ISBN 0615901743.
- La Grande Sortie, Lehmann Maupin. 2016. ISBN 9780692763025.
- Alex Prager: Silver Lake Drive, Thames & Hudson. 2018. ISBN 0500544972.
- Play the Wind Catalog, Lehmann Maupin & Alex Prager Studio. 2019.
- Farewell, Work Holiday Parties Brochure, Los Angeles County Museum of Art & Alex Prager Studio. 2020.
- Alex Prager 2022 Catalog, Alex Prager Studio. 2022. ISBN 9798218106584.

== Filmography ==
- Despair (2010)
- Touch of Evil (2011)
- La Petite Mort (2012)
- Sunday (2012) – for W Magazine
- Face in the Crowd (2013)
- La Grande Sortie (2015)
- Uncanny Valley (2018)
- Play the Wind (2019)
- Part One: The Mountain Interviews (2021)
- Run (2022)
- DreamQuil (2026)

== Solo exhibitions ==
- Polyester, Robert Berman Gallery, Los Angeles, 2007
- The Big Valley, Michael Hoppen Gallery, London, 2008; Yancey Richardson Gallery, New York City, 2009
- Week-end, Yancey Richardson Gallery, New York City, 2010
- Compulsion, Foam Fotografiemuseum Amsterdam, 2012
- Mise-en-scène, Savannah College of Art and Design, 2013
- Face in the Crowd, Corcoran Gallery of Art, 2013; The Arts Club, London, 2014; M+B Gallery, Los Angeles, 2014; Lehmann Maupin Gallery, New York City, 2014; Saint Louis Art Museum, Saint Louis, 2015
- Alex Prager, The National Gallery of Victoria, Australia, 2014
- Alex Prager, Istanbul '74, Istanbul, 2015
- La Grande Sortie, Lehmann Maupin, New York City, 2016
- Alex Prager: Silver Lake Drive, The Photographers' Gallery, London, 2018; Museum of Fine Arts Le Locle, Le Locle, Switzerland, 2018; Foam Fotografiemuseum, Amsterdam, 2019; Fondazione Sozzani, Milan, 2019
- Welcome Home, Fotografiska, Stockholm, 2019; Fotografiska, Tallinn, Estonia, 2020
- Play the Wind, Lehmann Maupin, New York City, 2019
- Alex Prager: Farewell, Work Holiday Parties, Los Angeles County Museum of Art, Los Angeles, CA, 2020
- Part One: The Mountain, Lehmann Maupin, London, 2022
- Alex Prager: Big West, Lotte Museum of Art, Seoul, 2022
- Part Two: Run, Lehmann Maupin, Palm Beach, 2022; Lehmann Maupin, New York City, 2023
- Western Mechanics, Lehmann Maupin, Seoul, 2024
- U.S. Department of State, Art in Embassies Program, New Delhi, India, 2024

== Group exhibitions ==
- New Photography 2010, Museum of Modern Art, New York, 2010
- No Fashion, Please: Photography Between Gender and Lifestyle, Kunsthalle Wien, Vienna, 2011
- Another Story: Photography from the Moderna Museet Collection, Moderna Museet, Stockholm, 2011
- Portrait of a Generation, The Hole, New York City, 2012
- At the Window: The Photographer's View, J. Paul Getty Museum, Los Angeles, 2013
- The Noir Effect, Skirball Cultural Center, Los Angeles, 2014
- Open Rhapsody: A Journey Into Photography and Video Collections, Beirut Exhibition Center, Beirut, 2015
- Telling Tales: Contemporary Narrative Photography, McNay Art Museum, San Antonio, 2016
- In Production: Art and the Studio System, Yuz Museum Shanghai, Shanghai, 2019
- Flora / Fauna, Josée Bienvenu Gallery, New York City, 2019
- Terminal, City Gallery Wellington, Wellington, NZ, 2020
- Oil. Beauty and Horror in the Petrol Age, Kunstmuseum Wolfsburg, Wolfsburg, 2021
- Still Present!, 12th Berlin Biennale for Contemporary Art, Berlin, Germany, 2022
- Freedom of Movement: Contemporary Art and Design from the NGV Collection, National Gallery of Victoria, Melbourne, Australia, 2022
- Killing TV, Tai Kwun, Hong Kong, China, 2023
- Photography: Real and Imagined, National Gallery of Victoria, Melbourne, Australia
- Fragile Beauty: Photographs from the Sir Elton John and David Furnish Photography Collection, Victoria & Albert Museum South Kensington, London, United Kingdom, 2024

== Awards ==
- 2006: London Photographic Award
- 2009: The Vevey International Photography Award
- 2012: News and Documentary Emmy Award for New Approaches to News & Documentary Programming: Arts, Lifestyle & Culture for The New York Times-commissioned piece Touch of Evil, starring Jessica Chastain, George Clooney, Glenn Close, Kirsten Dunst, Rooney Mara, Brad Pitt, and others
- 2012: Foam Paul Huf Award, Foam Fotografiemuseum Amsterdam
