= Jeanne Lombard =

Swiss painter (1865–1945)

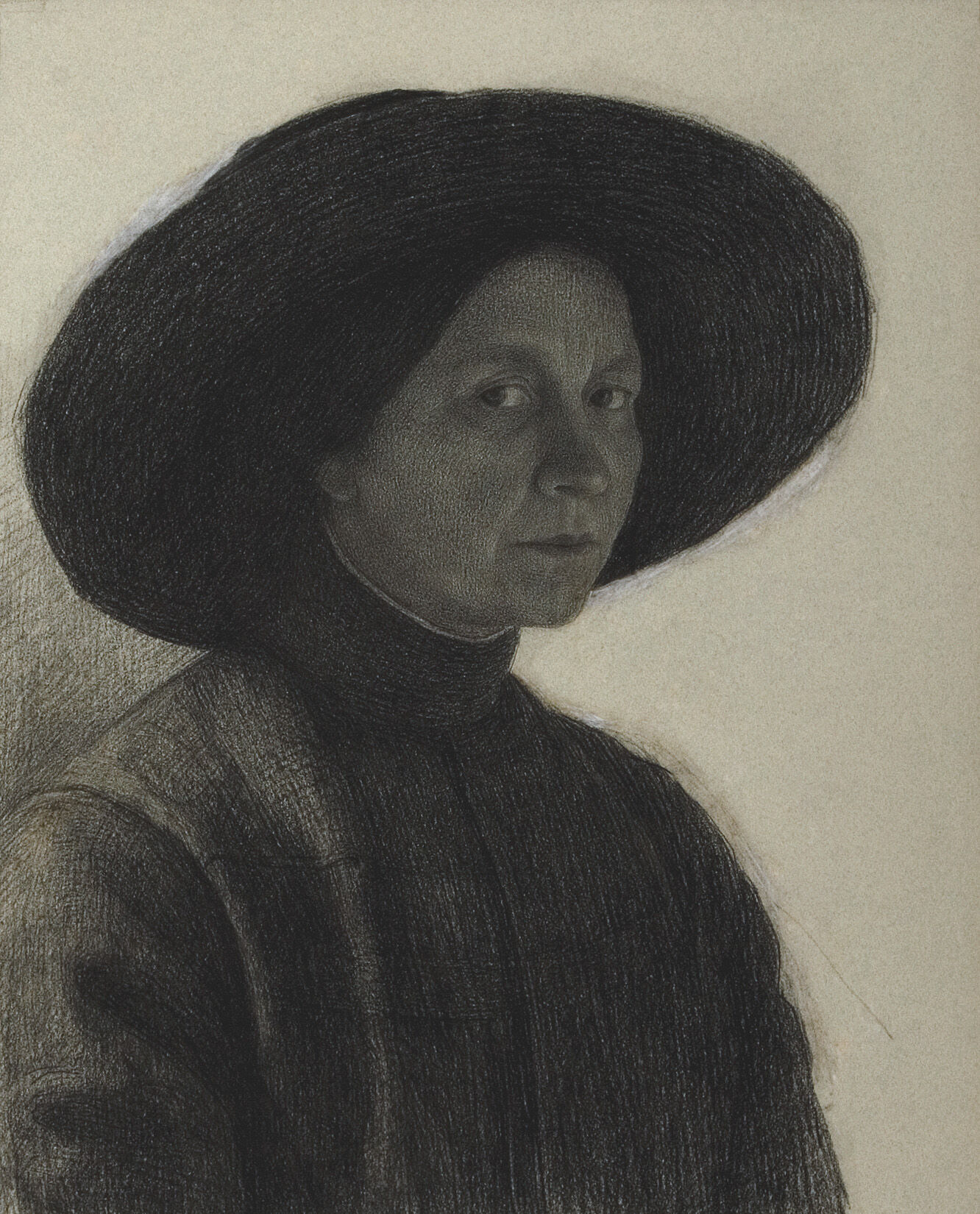
Charcoal self-portrait

Jeanne Lombard (22 August 1865 – 6 December 1945) was a Swiss painter and drawer, best remembered for her history paintings on Protestantism, still lifes and portrait paintings about women's suffrage. Her works are now in the collection of the Musée d'art et d'histoire de Neuchâtel.

== Biography ==
Lombard was born on 22 August 1865 in Le Grand-Saconnex, canton of Geneva, Switzerland. She spent her childhood in France before returning to her native country in 1879, when her father was appointed pastor in Auvernier. Encouraged by him, Lombard began studying drawing at the age of fourteen with sculptor and medalist Fritz-Ulysse Landry, then studied painting under Gustave Jeanneret. From 1888 onwards, she exhibited regularly at the Société des Amis des Arts in Neuchâtel. Lombard continued her training in the 1890s in the studio of portrait painter Jean-Louis Loubet in Lyon, where she received an honorable mention at the city's Salon, and then pursued further studies in Paris with the painters Rodolphe Julian and Marie Krug.

A devout Protestant, Lombard was involved in several social causes, including the League of Swiss Abstinent Women. Beginning in 1907, she produced a series of paintings depicting the Huguenot experience in France after the revocation of the Edict of Nantes, which solidified her reputation. Faced with the exclusion of women from the Swiss Society of Painters, Sculptors and Architects, Lombard co-founded the Neuchâtel section of the Swiss Society of Women Painters and Sculptors in 1908. She served as its secretary from 1909 to 1933 and became an honorary member in 1941. Lombard died on 6 December 1945 in Corcelles, canton of Neuchâtel, aged 80.

== Selected works ==
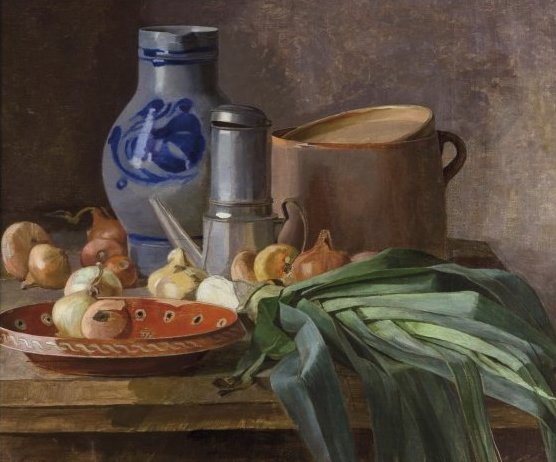
Still life with jug and vegetables, c. 1900

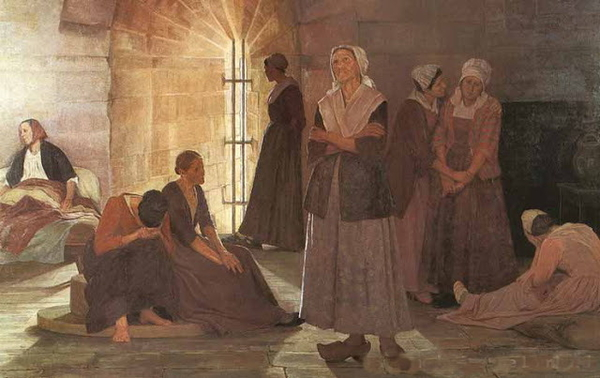
Huguenot prisoners at the Tour de Constance, 1907

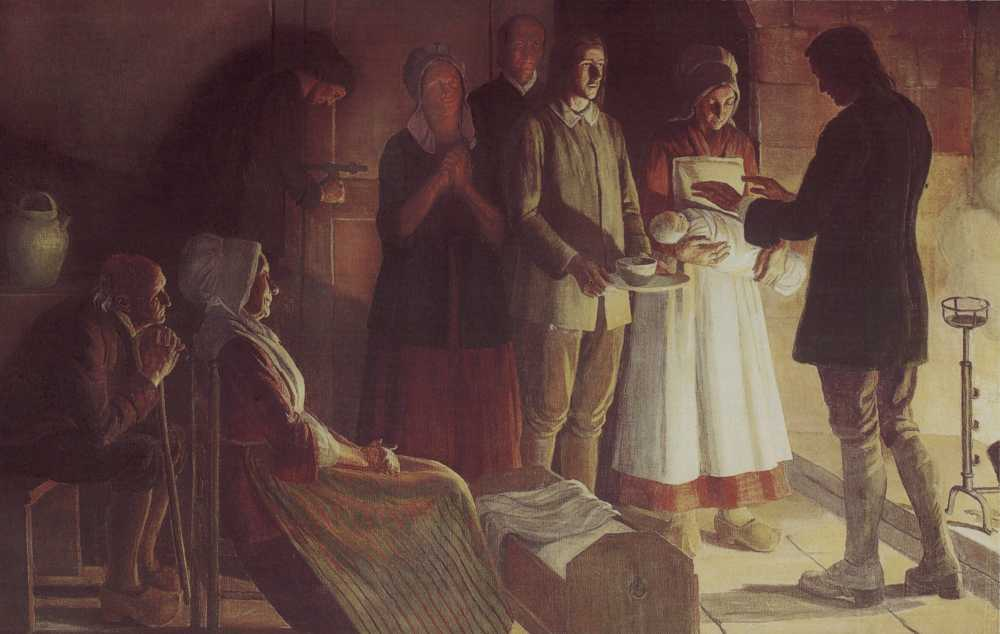
Clandestine baptism, 1925

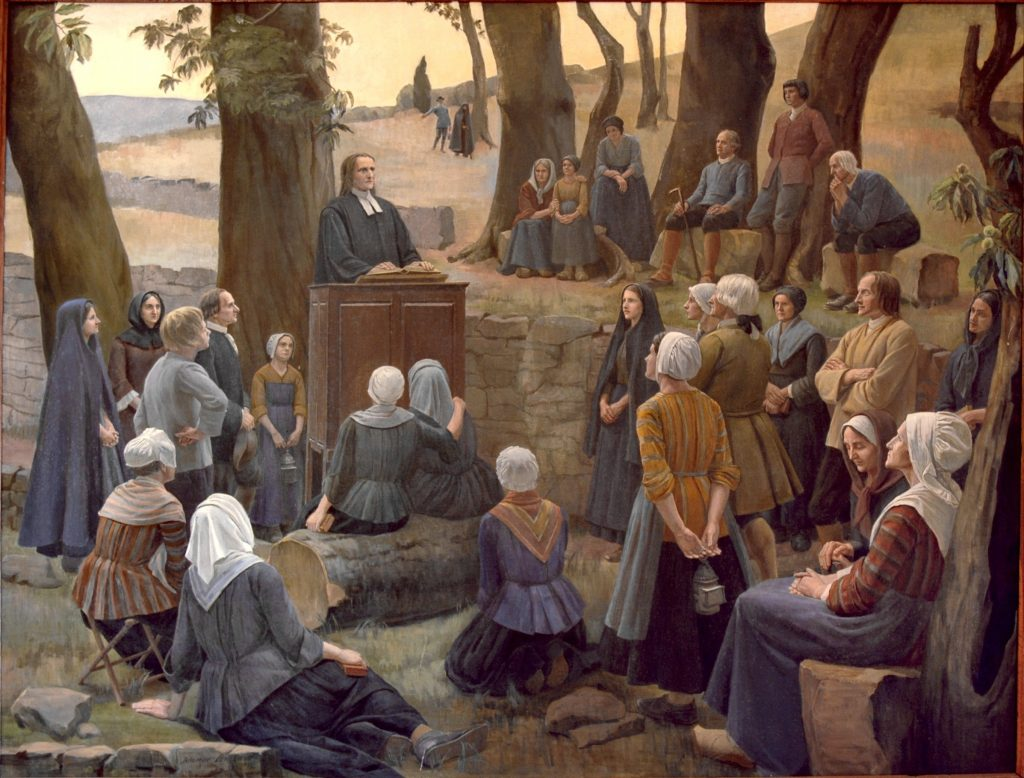
Assembly in the desert, 1934

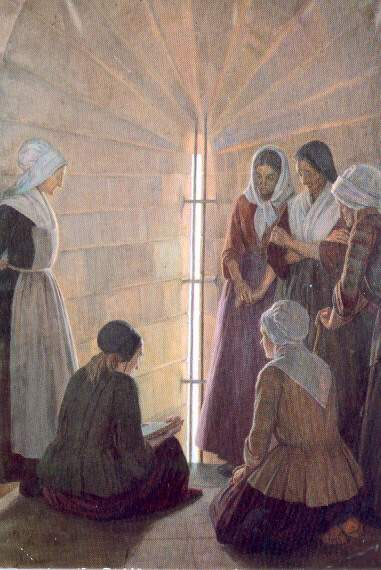
Prisoners reading the Bible at the Tour de Constance, 1938
