= Vaussard =

Vaussard is a surname. Notable people with the surname include:

- Christiane Vaussard (1923–2011), French ballet dancer, teacher, and choreographer
- Jeanne Vaussard (1891–1977), French tennis player
- Maurice Vaussard (1888–1978), French writer and essayist
