= Museum of Fine Arts Le Locle =

Musée des beaux-arts
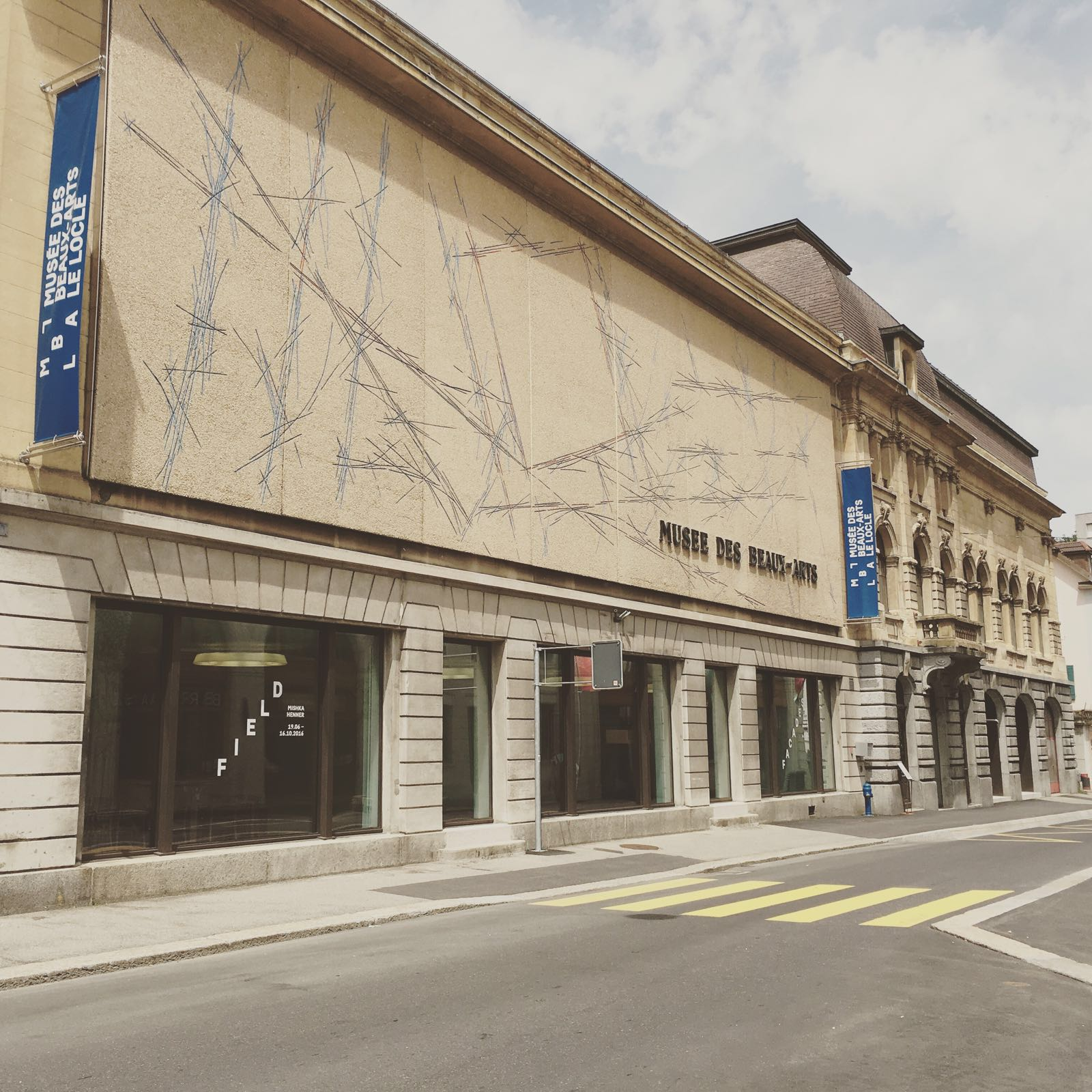
- View of the Musée des beaux-arts Le Locle
- Established: 1862
- Location: rue Marie-Anne-Calame 6, Le Locle, Canton of Neuchâtel, Switzerland
- Coordinates: 47.059391°N 6.750903°E
- Type: Museum of Fine Arts
- Collections: Engravings, prints, paintings, sculptures
- Collection size: 5000 pieces
- Director: Federica Chiocchetti
- Curator: Nathalie Herschdorfer
- Website: mbal.ch

The Musée des beaux-arts du Locle (MBAL – Museum of Fine Arts Le Locle), located in the canton of Neuchâtel in the Switzerland, organizes temporary exhibitions three times a year. Showcasing prints, photographs, installations and paintings, solo and thematic exhibitions take place in a 2,000 m^{2} space. These exhibitions of Swiss and international art, past and present, highlight both emerging and established artists. Open to all techniques and mixed media in particular, MBAL also organises the Triennale de l'art imprimé contemporain (Triennial of Contemporary Prints).

== History ==
At the end of the Neuchâtel Revolution of 1848, Le Locle opened a museum dedicated to watchmaking, geology and natural sciences. Originally, only objects produced or sourced locally and that would be of interest to the local population were exhibited. In order to broaden the taste required for the booming local watch industry, the museum soon decided to include works of art, but always in connection with the region. In 1862, locally based members of the Société des Amis des Arts de Neuchâtel and students of Le Locle Drawing School (past and present), came together to form a society of artistic emulation and founded an association called Société des beaux-arts et du musée du Locle (The Fine Arts Society), which then became the MBAL as it exists today.

The first exhibition organised by the Société des beaux-arts et du musée took place from 10 to 30 June 1868. Originally, fine art exhibitions were held every two years in various premises made available to the Society. Then, in 1876, the first permanent exhibition was held in a hall of the town’s high school: this year marked the creation of the MBAL. However, the high school hall quickly became a meeting room and a repository for progressively acquired works. Exhibitions also took place in a room at the Casino du Locle between 1880 and 1913. It was not until 1913 that the MBAL moved into its current building.

From 2011 to 2014, expansion and redevelopment of the museum made it possible to renovate the exhibition rooms, now spread over four floors, and to create a café and shop, as well as a cultural media centre. Its Art Nouveau architecture has been preserved and highlighted thanks to the support of the Office de la protection des monuments et des sites (Office for Monument Protection) and of the Conseil d'Etat de la République et du Canton de Neuchâtel (State Council of the Republic and Canton of Neuchâtel).

Since 1884, the MBAL, through its Society, is a member of the Société suisse des beaux-arts (Swiss Society for Fine Arts). The museum is also a member of the Swiss Museums Association (SMA) and the International Council of Museums (ICOM).

== Collection ==
The MBAL houses a collection of nearly 3,500 graphic artworks, paintings and sculptures. The collection, assembled from gifts, legacies, purchases and donations (notably from the Confederation and the Gottfried Keller Foundation), is spread over more than 150 years, and mainly belongs to the Société des beaux-arts et du musée du Locle. It brings together works by regional, Swiss and international artists, some dating from the 17th and 18th centuries. However, most of the collection consists of works from the end of the 19th century to the present day.

Well-known artists such as Albert Anker, Charles Clément, Gustave Jeanneret, Édouard Jeanmaire, Charles L’Eplattenier, Léopold Robert, Otto et Benjamin Vautier, Francisco de Goya, Odilon Redon, Jean-Baptiste Corot, Pablo Picasso, Henri de Toulouse-Lautrec, Henri Matisse, etc. are included in the collection. These works are regularly exhibited during temporary exhibitions. From 1946, under the leadership of its director Charles Chautems, the museum showed a keen interest in etching and printmaking and presented a first exhibition entitled Le livre moderne illustré (The Modern Illustrated Book). The success was immediate and a second exhibition followed in 1950: 50 ans de gravure française (50 Years of French Engraving). It was organised in collaboration with the Comité national de la gravure française (National Committee for French Engraving) and the Cabinet des Estampes de Paris. The interest aroused by the prints of Bonnard, Cézanne, Toulouse-Lautrec, Chagall and many other artists, encouraged the MBAL to focus its collection on original printmaking, while remaining open to other media. To reinforce this focus and boost its activity, the museum installed a printmaking workshop in 1980. Introductory engraving and etching classes were offered and the facilities made available to artists. Today, prints make up the bulk of the MBAL’s collection.

The MBAL has also housed the Lermite Foundation since 1977, the year of the death of locally based artist Jean-Pierre Schmid, known as Lermite (1920-1977), which works towards the recognition and promotion of his art. During his lifetime, the artist donated his entire graphic work to the MBAL. This collection was completed in 2001 with the purchase of more than 200 works, including stained glass projects, large paintings, drawings and lithographs.

== Exhibitions ==
With three cycles of temporary exhibitions per year, the MBAL offers visitors the opportunity to see art from different perspectives. Whether it is prints, photographs, paintings or installations, solo and thematic exhibitions bring together the art of the 20th and 21st centuries. Each exhibition cycle highlights Swiss and international artists and shows emerging as well as renowned artists. Some exhibitions presented at the Musée des beaux-arts of Le Locle since 2014.

- Photobook - The Cult of the Book (2017-06-18 - 2017-10-15)
- Henry Leutwyler - Document (2017-06-18 - 2017-10-15)
- Between Art and Fashion - Photographs from the collection of Carla Sozzani (2017-06-18 - 2017-10-15)
- Ina Jang - Utopia (2017-06-18 - 2017-10-15)
- Anni Albers - L'œuvre gravé (2017-02-19-2017-05-28)
- Sol LeWitt - 6 Wall Drawings (2017-02-19 - 2017-10-15)
- Hiroshi Sugimoto - Past and Present in Three Parts (2016-11-06 - 2017-01-29)
- André Evrard - Suites rythmées (2016-11-06 - 2017-01-29)
- Markus Brunetti - FACADES (2016-06-19 - 2016-10-16)
- Mishka Henner - Field (2016-06-19 - 2016-10-16)
- Andy Warhol - Premiers dessins (2016-02-21 - 2016-05-29)
- Vik Muniz - La fabrique de l'image (2015-11-08 - 2016-01-31)
- Henri Cartier-Bresson - Premières photographies (2015-02-22 - 2015-05-31)
- Lermite - Perspectives jurassiennes (2014-11-16 - 2015-05-22)
- François Berthoud - Pour la Mode (2014-06-29 - 2014-10-26)
- Erik Desmazières - Captures du réel (2014-02-22 - 2014-06-08)

In addition to its exhibitions and since 1992, the MBAL integrates every three years into its programme the Triennale de l'art imprimé contemporain/Triennial of Contemporary Prints (formerly known as the Triennale de l'estampe originale dédiée à l’art imprimé). In its early days, the event - in conjunction with the museum's collections - exhibited only Swiss artists; it then gradually opened up to international talent. Each edition awards the Prix de la Ville du Locle. The Triennial is an additional opportunity for the museum to promote printmaking as an art form.

== Cultural media centre ==
The MBAL organises visits and workshops for children. Adults, professionals and personalities from the world of art and culture are invited to participate in round tables on a variety of topics. Several weekends a year, families are given the opportunity to take part in various activities in specific areas of the museum: family brunches, concerts, dance performances, etc.

In addition to the activities it provides, the MBAL offers visitors several educational tools that allow them to deepen their knowledge on certain subjects and discover the exhibitions from another perspective. An activity book, which includes games and anecdotes about artists and the exhibited works is given to children upon their arrival at the museum. For adults, the MBAL produces a series of small bilingual publications, in French and English, which offer an interview with an emerging artist who is exhibiting at the museum and works with digital tools (three issues already published in March 2017)

== Bibliography ==
Art imprimé contemporain. Triennial of Contemporary Prints, Musée des beaux-arts Le Locle, June 21, 2015 - October 18, 2015, Le Locle, MBAL, 2015.

Catalogue du Musée des Beaux-Arts de la ville du Locle, 2^{e} ed., Le Locle, 1910.

Charles Chautems, L'art dans la cité - Anniversaire du Musée des beaux-arts, Le Locle, 1862-1987, Le Locle, MBAL, 1993.

Charles Chautems, Images. Musée des beaux-arts de la ville du Locle. Introduction by René Felber, Le Locle [sd].

François Faessler, Historique du Centenaire du Musée des Beaux-Arts de la Ville du Locle, Le Locle, 1962.

L'art imprimé en Suisse - Die Schweizer Druckgrafik 2004-2007, Le Locle/Zurich, MBAL/Benteli, 2010.

L'art imprimé en Suisse - Prints in Switzerland 2007-2010, Le Locle/Zurich, MBAL/Benteli, 2010.

Lelocleprints04 - Triennale de l'estampe contemporaine. Triennial of Contemporary Prints, Musée des beaux-arts Le Locle, September 4 - November 28, 2004, Le Locle, MBAL, 2004.

Lieux d'art - Les plus beaux musées de Suisse, vol.2, Zurich, Patrimoine suisse, 2016.

Could You Talk About Mishka Henner, text by Joël Vacheron, Le Locl, MBAL, 2016.

Could You Talk About Dan Holdsworth, text by Joël Vacheron, Le Locle, MBAL, 2016.

Could You Talk About Mathieu Bernard-Reymond, text by Joël Vacheron, Le Locle, MBAL, 2017.

Prix de la Ville du Locle - 1^{ere}Triennale de l'Esampe originale, Le Locle, MBAL, 1992.

République et Canton de Neuchâtel, Service de la Culture, Office du patrimoine et de l'archéologie - Principaux chantiers de restauration soutenus par des subventions cantonales et/ou fédérales de 2000 à 2015| url=http://www.ne.ch/autorites/DJSC/SCNE/patrimoine/transformations/Documents/subv00-15.pdf.

== See also ==
- Le Locle
- International Council of Museums (ICOM)
- List of museums in Switzerland
