= Pierre Charles Alexandre Louis =

French clinician, pathologist and physician

Pierre-Charles-Alexandre Louis
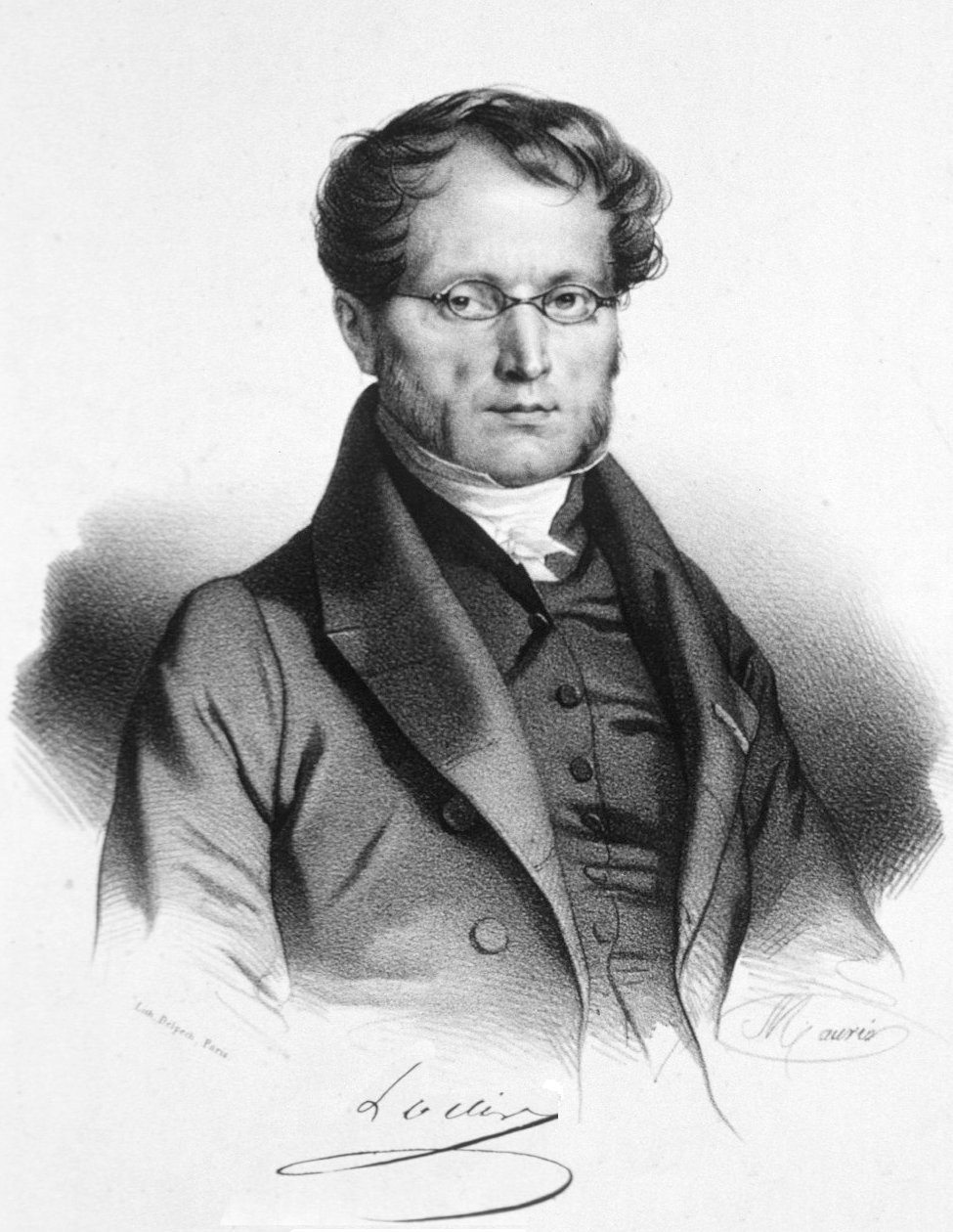
- Lithography of Pierre-Charles-Alexandre from Fielding Hudson Garrison's An introduction to the history of medicine
- Born: 14 April 1787; Ay, Champagne, France
- Died: 22 August 1872 (aged 85)
- Resting place: Montparnasse
- Citizenship: French
- Known for: Development of the "numerical method", precursor to epidemiology and the modern clinical trial
- Scientific career
- Fields: Medicine, pathology, epidemiology
- Institutions: Hôtel-Dieu de Paris, Pitié-Salpêtrière Hospital
- Doctoral students: Victor Gautier

Pierre-Charles-Alexandre Louis (14 April 1787 – 22 August 1872) was a French physician, clinician and pathologist known for his studies on tuberculosis, typhoid fever, and pneumonia, but Louis's greatest contribution to medicine was the development of the "numerical method", forerunner to epidemiology and the modern clinical trial, paving the path for evidence-based medicine.

== Biography ==
Louis was born in Ay, Champagne, the son of a wine merchant. He grew up during the French Revolution and initially thought to study law, later switching to medicine, graduating in 1813. His initial studies were in Reims, but he completed them in Paris.

Louis married late in life, having a single son (Armand) who died of tuberculosis while still a boy in 1854, and Louis retired from medical practice the same year. The American politician Charles Sumner, who visited Louis and observed him teaching at the Hôtel-Dieu de Paris, described him as "a tall man, with a countenance that seems quite passive." Louis also taught at the Pitié-Salpêtrière Hospital, also in Paris, and counted Oliver Wendell Holmes Sr. as one of his students.

== Training ==
After graduation, Louis accompanied the Compte de Saint-Priest, a family friend, to Russia, travelling with the Compte for several years before settling in the Ukrainian city of Odessa in 1816. He maintained a successful private practice for four years, receiving the honorary title of physician from the Tsar. However, in 1820 an outbreak of diphtheria forced him to recognize the inadequacy of his medical knowledge. He returned to Paris where he worked, initially without pay, at a hospital for seven years, collecting the case histories of thousands of patients and performing hundreds of autopsies. He eventually wrote studies on the treatment of tuberculosis and typhoid fever, and produced the "numerical method" for evaluating the effectiveness of therapies.

== Numerical method ==
Starting in 1823, Louis began publishing the results of his research on a variety of topics, numerically analyzing information gathered from his case studies and autopsies.

In the 19th century, an influential theory was proposed by French physician François-Joseph-Victor Broussais, that fevers were the result of inflammation of the organs, and bloodletting was an effective treatment for any fever. Louis disagreed, publishing a paper in 1828 to that fact (expanded in 1834 to a book-length treatise in the American Journal of the Medical Sciences entitled "An essay on clinical instruction"), which demonstrated that the use of bloodletting for pneumonia was ineffective. Louis' approach was strongly resisted by doctors at the time, who were unwilling to wait for tests to determine if current treatments were effective, or discard treatments if they were found ineffective. Gradually Louis' methods gained acceptance as doctors began recognizing the "numerical method" added objectivity to treatment approaches and improved outcomes. The "numerical method" involved the use of averages of groups of patients with the same illness to determine what should be done with individual cases of that illness. As part of the study, Louis emphasized the importance of the similarity of patients beyond mere disease, and attempted to account for factors such as age of patients in different treatment groups, diet, severity of illness and other treatments used beyond bloodletting. Louis also emphasized the importance of population (rather than individual) comparisons in the belief that differences between individual patients would "average out" in the group, though he failed to grasp the importance of randomization to ensure this. Opponents argued that individual cases were too diverse to be combined into statistically average groups; Louis responded by pointing out even individual cases have commonalities, and by claiming each case is unique, no progress could ever be made within medicine. Louis acknowledged his own research included too few cases for absolute certainty in the treatment methods, and his student later stated that once a total of 500 cases had been accumulated, then certainty could be reached.

Louis' first study of the topic was of the use of bloodletting in pneumonia, selecting 77 patients with a very similar form of pneumonia. After determining the timing of onset, duration and frequency of death rates of the disease, Louis then analyzed the timing of the bloodletting as either early (1–4 days since the start of the illness) or late (5–9 days). Based on these patients, Louis found that those who were bled early recovered earlier than those bled late, but also died at greater rates. Based on his findings, Louis concluded bloodletting was only a valid use in the late stages of disease. The ultimate impact of Louis' studies on the practice of medicine is hard to evaluate, as the practice of bloodletting was already beginning to decline when he published his results.

Little is known of Louis' training in math or medicine, or how he developed his "numerical method". At the time of his practice, the mathematician Pierre-Simon Laplace was extremely influential and had introduced the concept of correlation as a component of science; Louis may have drawn upon these concepts during his studies.

== Legacy ==
Louis conducted other, similar pre-epidemiological work, dividing patients into exposed/affected versus unexposed/unaffected groups to determine similar relationships between illness and etiology, deducting for instance the heritable nature of emphysema. For his work on the numerical method, Louis was elected the president in perpetuity of the Society for Medical Observation, a society formed by his students. Louis is also credited by some for standardizing the patient history, starting with questions about general health and narrowing down to specific symptoms. He was elected a Foreign Honorary Member of the American Academy of Arts and Sciences in 1849.

Louis was mentor to Oliver Wendell Holmes Sr. during the younger man's training in Paris and strongly influenced his skeptical outlook.
