= Ligue de femmes Suisses contre l'alcoolisme =

Women's temperance organization of Switzerland

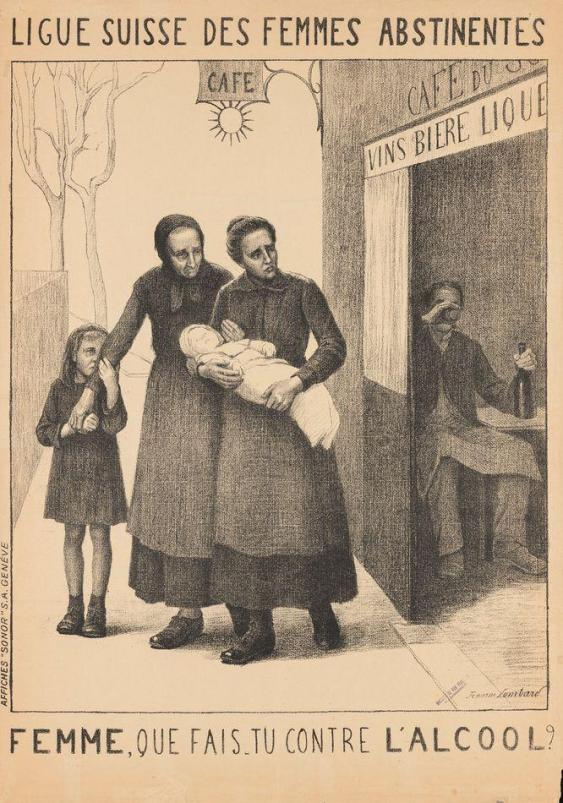
Poster of the League of Swiss Abstinent Women by Jeanne Lombard, c. 1910

Ligue de femmes Suisses contre l'alcoolisme (German, Schweizerischer Frauenverein gegen den Alkoholismus; League of Swiss Women Against Alcoholism; also known as League of Swiss Abstinent Women) was a women's temperance organization of Switzerland. Founded in Geneva on 3 November 1899, the headquarters were located at Rue Etienne-Dumont, 22, Geneva. A Central Committee, composed of 24 members, had charge of the affairs of the Ligue. The organization did not impose total abstinence on its members. It was broadly open to all women committed to the fight against the abuse of drink and to the resolute fight against absinthe and all distillation products. The Ligue was in constant contact with cantonal and municipal authorities. It was able to exert some influence, particularly on anti-alcohol education in schools.

== Early history ==
The principal object of the organization was to acquaint the women, young girls, and children of Switzerland with the fact that the use of alcohol in any form seriously endangers the health and happiness of their country. Although its name gives the impression that it was a national organization, the activities of the Ligue were practically limited to the town and canton of Geneva.

The society differed from the Swiss Women's Abstinence League (Schweizerischer Bund abstinenter Frauen) in that it admitted without distinction both abstainers and non-abstainers to membership. That fact perhaps accounted for the extremely rapid growth of the Ligue in the beginning (at the end of the first five years the membership had increased to 4,000), and the somewhat slower progress which it made subsequently.

One of the first major achievements of the Ligue was in connection with the juvenile phase of the temperance movement in Switzerland. An agreement was made with the teachers in the public schools of the canton, by which antialcoholic instruction was given to the children of Geneva. At first, a considerable amount of difficulty was experienced by the Ligue in overcoming the many prejudices of the educational authorities, but it was finally successful in persuading them to permit temperance instruction to be added to the school programs.

== 20th-century ==
On 27 November 1903 a conference on anti-alcohol education took place at the University of Geneva, organized by the Ligue, and at which the Department of Public Education invited members of the teaching staff. The agenda included a report from Mr. Grandjean, a teacher in Neuchâtel, on the state of the question in Switzerland, and a conference by Dr. Paul Maurice Legrain, chief physician of the asiles d'aliénés de la Seine (Seine insane asylums). In addition to State Councilors, two women representing the Ligue, Mrs. Victor Gautier, President of the Ligue, and Mrs. John Rehfous, were seated on the platform. A key point made was that until that time, Switzerland did not dare to fight against alcoholism by real means, by effective action by schools. The country had allowed itself to be overtaken by other nations. No anti-alcohol education had been yet seriously organized and included in the programs.

By 1904, wwo comfortable anti-alcohol restaurants were set up by the Ligue, and a kiosk-restaurant for Electric Tramway employees was installed at La Jonction.

In 1909, the Ligue awarded a prize to the winner of a public-school temperance essay contest, and made it an annual custom ever since.

In the summer of 1911, the Ligue facilitated a children's flower contest. Cuttings of pea geraniums and fuchsias were given to girls. The object was for the children to grow these cuttings into beautiful house plants to demonstrate how beauty in the home induces men to prefer staying at home instead of visiting a saloon.

The Ligue sent out surveys during the year 1912 to the most important Swiss manufacturing firms to ascertain the extent to which these were discouraging the use of alcoholic drinks and supplying substitutes instead. They found that a considerable number already furnished non-alcoholic drinks (besides good drinking water), either for nothing or at a low cost. Hot tea in winter, and cold in summer, were favourite substitutes. The Winterthur firm of Sulzer Brothers provided in one year 712,685 bottles of tea, and in addition 16,479 litre of milk. A shoe manufacturing firm, Bally, of Schönenwerd, began to sell milk to its employees in 1900. The demand was only 12 litres a day. But nine years later, the daily sales had risen to 500 litres (among 1,482 workers). The Schaffhausen steel works sold 300 litres of milk daily, 600 of tea and 500 bottles of lemonade. Many industrial plants forbid the use of intoxicants during working hours and at midday meal. Some further gave anti-alcohol instruction by means of lectures, printed matter, and the personal example of the heads of departments and of the firm.

The Ligue maintained an active temperance propaganda in and around Geneva by means of antialcoholic conferences, public meetings to which prominent speakers were brought from abroad, temperance exhibitions, and scientific lectures on alcoholism and its various phases at the University of Geneva. In addition, group meetings for mothers and special temperance catechism classes for small children were held.

It was probably due to this form of temperance activity on the part of the Ligue and other similar local organizations that the canton of Geneva was the first to prohibit the sale of absinth, a popular vote for the prohibition showing a majority of 6,000.

=== World War I ===
Due to the demoralizing effects of World War I and the severe economic crisis which followed it, the work of the Ligue became hampered. However, the War aided the temperance women of the Swiss Confederation in one way: it permitted them to put into practise some of the principles for which they had been striving for 20 years. Many of them became nurses in the military hospitals along the Swiss frontiers, where they were given the opportunity to distribute temperance literature among the sick and wounded soldiers of the various nations fighting in that vicinity. The Ligue was also successful in the establishment of a number of non-alcoholic rest rooms for the soldiers in the military camps along the Swiss borders.

Although greatly embarrassed by the lack of funds and energetic active members, the Ligue resumed most of its pre-War activities after World War I.

== Organ ==
The League published a monthly paper, Bulletin Mensuel, a four-page periodical.

== Bibliography ==
- Bulletin Mensuel, February 1924
- Joris, Elisabeth (2016). Frauengeschichte(n) - Dokumente aus zwei Jahrhunderten zur Situation der Frauen in der Schweiz [Women's history(s) - Documents from two centuries on the situation of women in Switzerland] (in German). Limmat Verlag. ISBN 9783038550662.
