= Le Grand-Saconnex =

- Municipality
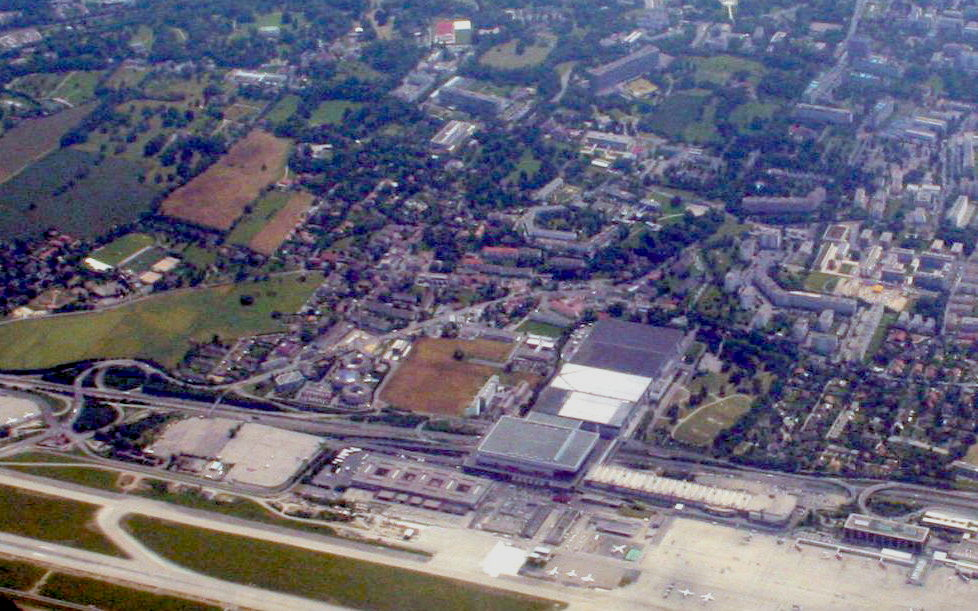

- Flag Coat of arms
- Location of Le Grand-Saconnex
- Location within Switzerland Location within Canton of Geneva
- Coordinates: 46°14′N 06°07′E
- Country: Switzerland
- Canton: Geneva
- District: n.a.

Government
  - Mayor: Maire; Elizabeth Böhler-Goodship

Area
  - Total: 4.38 km^{2} (1.69 sq mi)
- Elevation: 452 m (1,483 ft)

Population (December 2020)
  - Total: 12,378
  - Density: 2,830/km^{2} (7,320/sq mi)
- Time zone: UTC+01:00 (CET)
  - Summer (DST): UTC+02:00 (CEST)
- Postal code: 1218
- SFOS number: 6623
- ISO 3166 code: CH-GE
- Surrounded by: Bellevue, Ferney-Voltaire (FR-01), Geneva (Genève), Meyrin, Pregny-Chambésy, Vernier
- Twin towns: Carantec (France)
- Website: grand-saconnex.ch

Le Grand-Saconnex (French pronunciation: [lə ɡʁɑ̃ sakɔnɛ]) is a municipality of the Canton of Geneva, Switzerland.

Several international organizations and permanent missions to the United Nations are located in Grand Saconnex. Consequently, the population of Grand Saconnex is quite cosmopolitan one of the most diverse in Switzerland, with nearly 40% of the population being born outside of Switzerland.

Geneva Airport is partially within the areas of Le Grand-Saconnex.

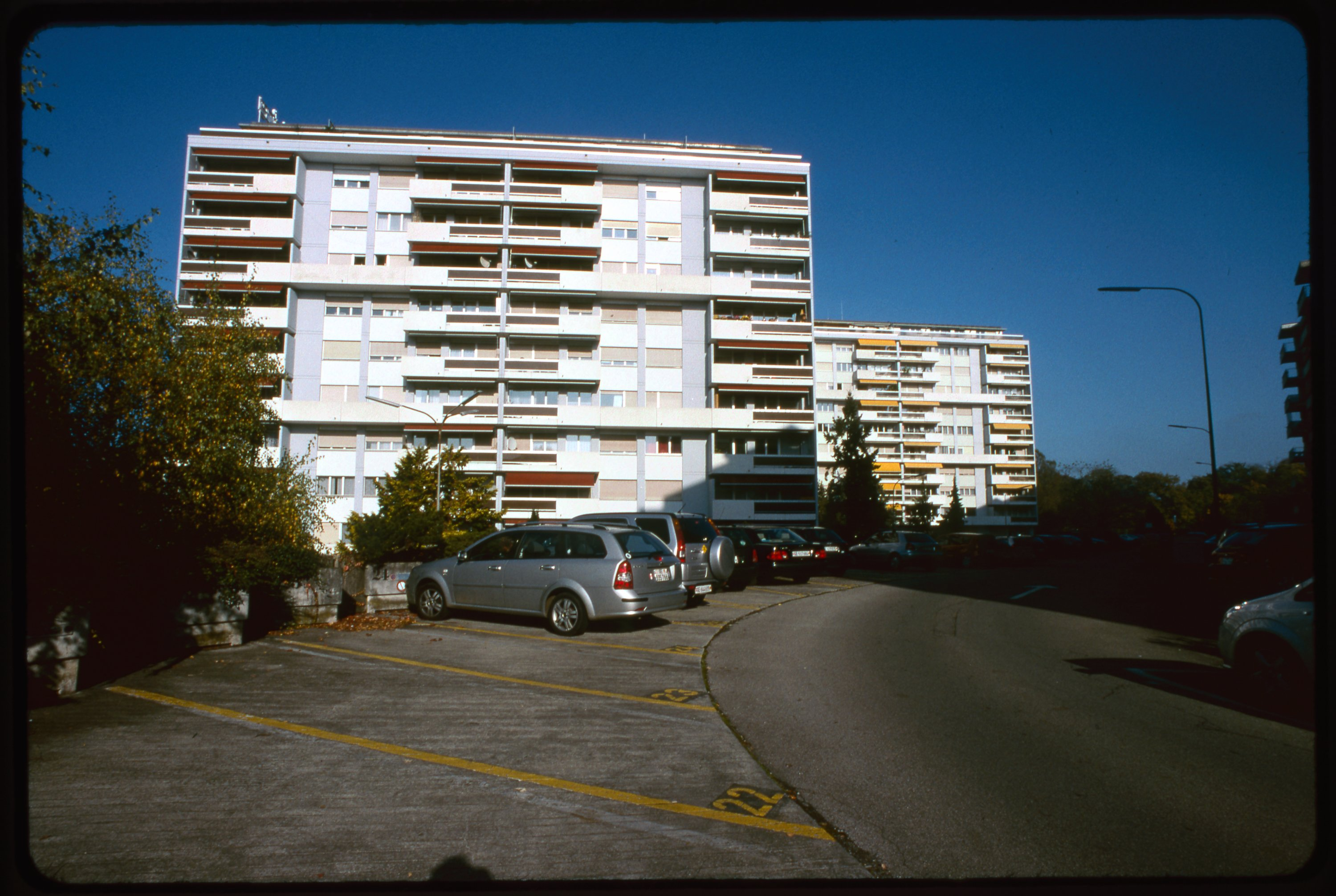
Housing in Le Grand-Saconnex

== History ==
Le Grand-Saconnex is first mentioned in 1128 as Saconai.

== Geography ==
Le Grand-Saconnex has an area, as of 2009, of 4.38 square kilometers (1.69 sq mi). Of this area, 0.62 km^{2} (0.24 sq mi) or 14.2% is used for agricultural purposes, while 0.09 km^{2} (0.035 sq mi) or 2.1% is forested. Of the rest of the land, 3.66 km^{2} (1.41 sq mi) or 83.6% is settled (buildings or roads).

Of the built up area, industrial buildings made up 1.1% of the total area while housing and buildings made up 32.9% and transportation infrastructure made up 41.8%. Power and water infrastructure as well as other special developed areas made up 2.5% of the area while parks, green belts and sports fields made up 5.3%. Out of the forested land, 0.7% of the total land area is heavily forested and 1.4% is covered with orchards or small clusters of trees. Of the agricultural land, 5.9% is used for growing crops and 7.1% is pastures, while 1.1% is used for orchards or vine crops.

The municipality is located just to west of the city of Geneva and forms part of the greater Geneva area. It is on the right bank of Lake Geneva.

The municipality of Le Grand-Saconnex consists of the sub-sections or villages of Aéroport - Arena, Aéroport - fret, Les Blanchets, Grand-Saconnex - Organisations, Grand-Saconnex - village, La Tour - Chapeau-du-Curé, Le Pommier, Grand-Saconnex - Marais, Le Jonc and Palexpo.

== Demographics ==
Le Grand-Saconnex has a population (as of December 2020) of 12,378. As of 2008, 43.6% of the population are resident foreign nationals. Over the last 10 years (1999–2009) the population has changed at a rate of 37.4%. It has changed at a rate of 31.8% due to migration and at a rate of 5.9% due to births and deaths.

Most of the population (as of 2000) speaks French (5,759 or 71.0%), with English being second most common (550 or 6.8%) and German being third (372 or 4.6%). There are 293 people who speak Italian and 1 person who speaks Romansh.

As of 2008, the gender distribution of the population was 47.6% male and 52.4% female. The population was made up of 3,058 Swiss men (25.8% of the population) and 2,584 (21.8%) non-Swiss men. There were 3,526 Swiss women (29.8%) and 2,675 (22.6%) non-Swiss women. Of the population in the municipality 1,049 or about 12.9% were born in Le Grand-Saconnex and lived there in 2000. There were 1,727 or 21.3% who were born in the same canton, while 1,166 or 14.4% were born somewhere else in Switzerland, and 3,219 or 39.7% were born outside of Switzerland.

In 2008 there were 69 live births to Swiss citizens and 46 births to non-Swiss citizens, and in same time span there were 52 deaths of Swiss citizens and 22 non-Swiss citizen deaths. Ignoring immigration and emigration, the population of Swiss citizens increased by 17 while the foreign population increased by 24. There were 26 Swiss men and 24 Swiss women who emigrated from Switzerland. At the same time, there were 112 non-Swiss men and 65 non-Swiss women who immigrated from another country to Switzerland. The total Swiss population change in 2008 (from all sources, including moves across municipal borders) was an increase of 107 and the non-Swiss population increased by 41 people. This represents a population growth rate of 1.4%.

The age distribution of the population (as of 2000) is children and teenagers (0–19 years old) make up 22.6% of the population, while adults (20–64 years old) make up 64% and seniors (over 64 years old) make up 13.5%.

As of 2000, there were 3,259 people who were single and never married in the municipality. There were 3,995 married individuals, 346 widows or widowers and 514 individuals who are divorced.

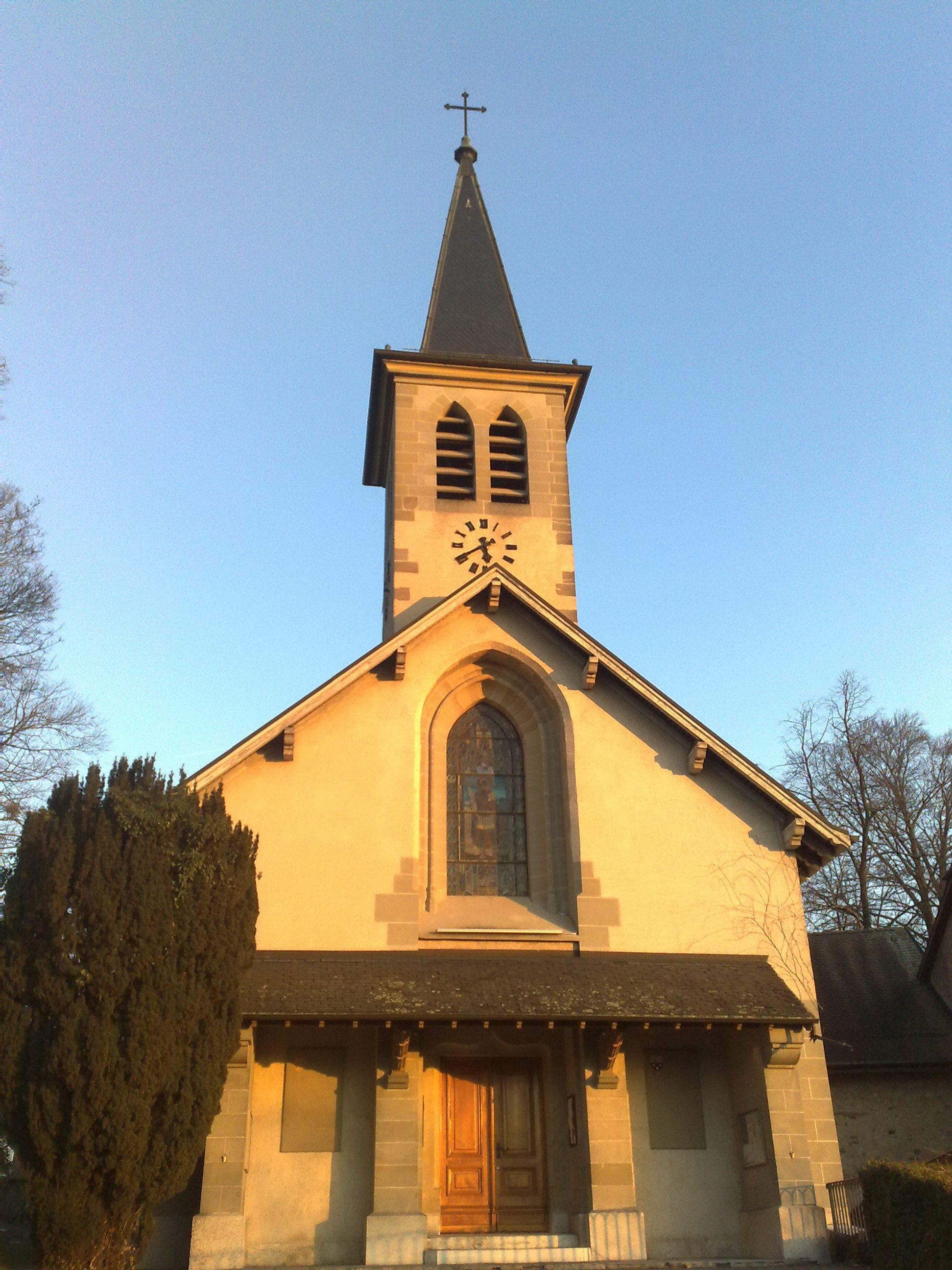
Saint-Hyppolyte Catholic church in Le Grand-Saconnex

As of 2000, there were 3,234 private households in the municipality, and an average of 2.2 persons per household. There were 1,154 households that consist of only one person and 163 households with five or more people. Out of a total of 3,314 households that answered this question, 34.8% were households made up of just one person and there were 9 adults who lived with their parents. Of the rest of the households, there are 817 married couples without children, 952 married couples with children There were 268 single parents with a child or children. There were 34 households that were made up of unrelated people and 80 households that were made up of some sort of institution or another collective housing.

In 2000 there were 536 single-family homes (or 62.5% of the total) out of a total of 858 inhabited buildings. There were 212 multi-family buildings (24.7%), along with 77 multi-purpose buildings that were mostly used for housing (9.0%) and 33 other use buildings (commercial or industrial) that also had some housing (3.8%). Of the single-family homes 43 were built before 1919, while 79 were built between 1990 and 2000. The greatest number of single-family homes (107) were built between 1961 and 1970.

In 2000 there were 3,731 apartments in the municipality. The most common apartment size was 3 rooms of which there were 960. There were 318 single room apartments and 906 apartments with five or more rooms. Of these apartments, a total of 3,139 apartments (84.1% of the total) were permanently occupied, while 513 apartments (13.7%) were seasonally occupied and 79 apartments (2.1%) were empty. As of 2009, the construction rate of new housing units was 10.7 new units per 1000 residents. The vacancy rate for the municipality, in 2010, was 0.22%.

The historical population is given in the following chart:

== Heritage sites of national significance ==
The World Council of Churches with Archives and the UNESCO Centre de documentation are listed as Swiss heritage site of national significance.

== Town twinning ==
Grand Saconnex is twinned with

- Carantec in Brittany, France

== Politics ==
In the 2007 federal election the most popular party was the SVP which received 20.99% of the vote. The next three most popular parties were the SP (17.22%), the Green Party (16.95%) and the FDP (13.11%). In the federal election, a total of 2,039 votes were cast, and the voter turnout was 46.2%.

In the 2009 Grand Conseil election, there were a total of 4,516 registered voters of which 1,679 (37.2%) voted. The most popular party in the municipality for this election was the MCG with 14.3% of the ballots. In the canton-wide election they received the third highest proportion of votes. The second most popular party was the Les Radicaux (with 14.0%), they were sixth in the canton-wide election, while the third most popular party was the Les Verts (with 13.6%), they were second in the canton-wide election.

For the 2009 Conseil d'État election, there were a total of 4,560 registered voters of which 2,023 (44.4%) voted.

In 2011, all the municipalities held local elections, and in Le Grand-Saconnex there were 25 spots open on the municipal council. There were a total of 6,496 registered voters of which 2,571 (39.6%) voted. Out of the 2,571 votes, there were 19 blank votes, 15 null or unreadable votes and 228 votes with a name that was not on the list.

== Economy ==
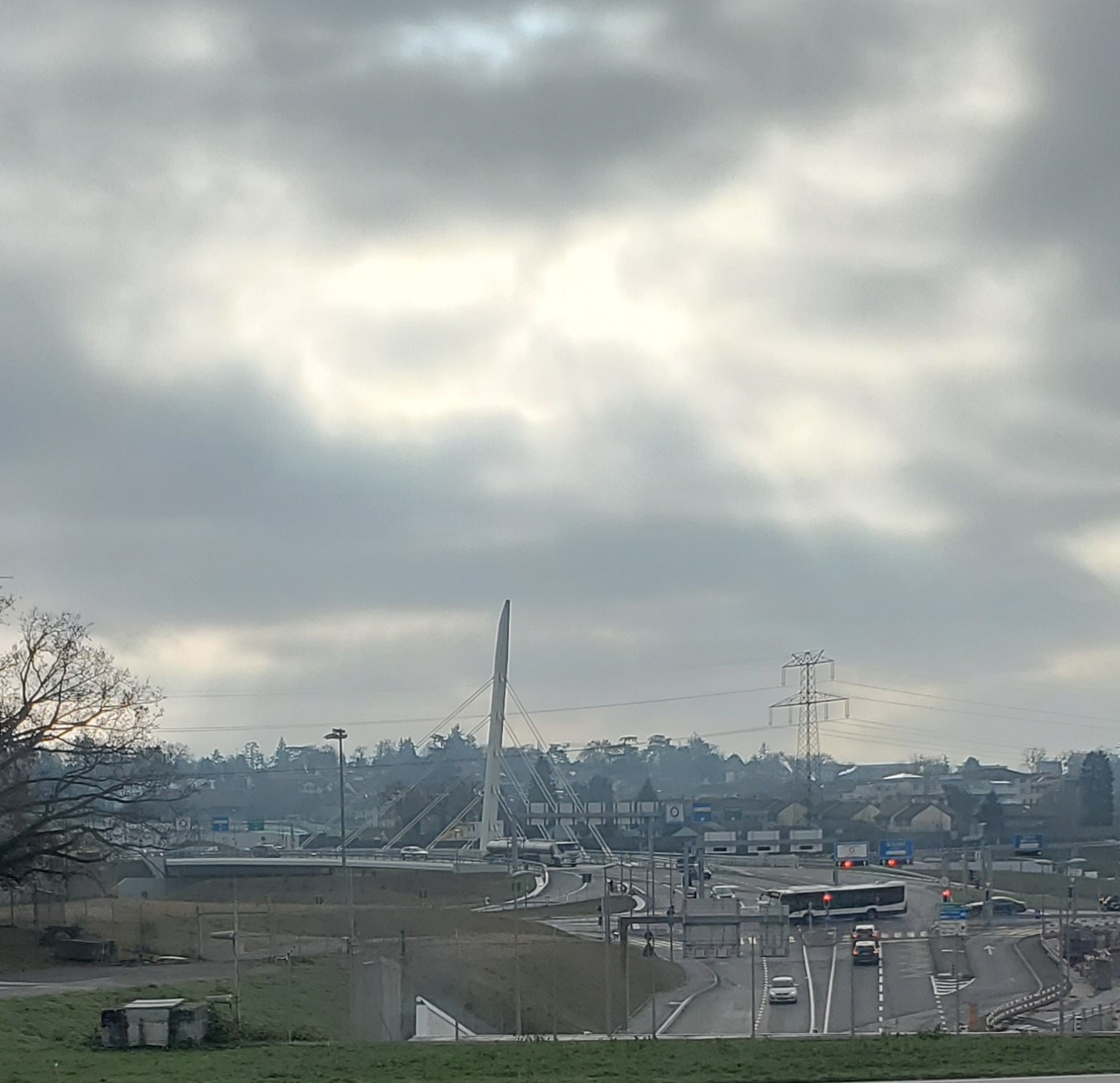
The cable-stayed bridge over the A1 highway crossing from Ferney and leading to Geneva.

Geneva International Airport is partially within Le Grand-Saconnex.

Palexpo the convention center of Geneva is within Le Grand-Saconnex. The complex is located next to the airport and held each year a multitude of exhibition. We can highlight the Geneva Motor Show and the Salon du livre.

As of 2010, Le Grand-Saconnex had an unemployment rate of 6.6%. As of 2008, there was 1 person employed in the primary economic sector and about 1 business involved in this sector. 243 people were employed in the secondary sector and there were 42 businesses in this sector. 8,955 people were employed in the tertiary sector, with 380 businesses in this sector. There were 4,171 residents of the municipality who were employed in some capacity, of which females made up 47.5% of the workforce.

In 2008 the total number of full-time equivalent jobs was 8,069. The number of jobs in the primary sector was 1, all of which were in agriculture. The number of jobs in the secondary sector was 230 of which 127 or (55.2%) were in manufacturing and 96 (41.7%) were in construction. The number of jobs in the tertiary sector was 7,838. In the tertiary sector; 1,347 or 17.2% were in wholesale or retail sales or the repair of motor vehicles, 2,856 or 36.4% were in the movement and storage of goods, 456 or 5.8% were in a hotel or restaurant, 232 or 3.0% were in the information industry, 97 or 1.2% were the insurance or financial industry, 302 or 3.9% were technical professionals or scientists, 62 or 0.8% were in education and 331 or 4.2% were in health care.

In 2000, there were 5,621 workers who commuted into the municipality and 3,394 workers who commuted away. The municipality is a net importer of workers, with about 1.7 workers entering the municipality for every one leaving. About 11.9% of the workforce coming into Le Grand-Saconnex are coming from outside Switzerland, while 0.3% of the locals commute out of Switzerland for work. Of the working population, 24.9% used public transportation to get to work, and 54.8% used a private car.

== Religion ==
From the 2000 census, 2,904 or 35.8% were Roman Catholic, while 1,428 or 17.6% belonged to the Swiss Reformed Church. Of the rest of the population, there were 213 members of an Orthodox church (or about 2.63% of the population), there were 3 individuals (or about 0.04% of the population) who belonged to the Christian Catholic Church, and there were 140 individuals (or about 1.73% of the population) who belonged to another Christian church. There were 46 individuals (or about 0.57% of the population) who were Jewish, and 439 (or about 5.41% of the population) who were Islamic. There were 23 individuals who were Buddhist, 34 individuals who were Hindu and 13 individuals who belonged to another church. 1,677 (or about 20.67% of the population) belonged to no church, are agnostic or atheist, and 1,194 individuals (or about 14.72% of the population) did not answer the question.

The Ecumenical Centre - housing the offices of the World Council of Churches, ACT Alliance, the World Student Christian Federation and the Lutheran World Federation - is in Le Grand-Saconnex.

YWCA also has its head office in Le Grand-Sacconex.

== Education ==
In Le Grand-Saconnex about 2,184 or (26.9%) of the population have completed non-mandatory upper secondary education, and 1,852 or (22.8%) have completed additional higher education (either university or a Fachhochschule). Of the 1,852 who completed tertiary schooling, 28.1% were Swiss men, 24.8% were Swiss women, 26.1% were non-Swiss men and 21.0% were non-Swiss women.

During the 2009-2010 school year there were a total of 2,367 students in the Le Grand-Saconnex school system. The education system in the Canton of Geneva allows young children to attend two years of non-obligatory Kindergarten. During that school year, there were 215 children who were in a pre-kindergarten class. The canton's school system provides two years of non-mandatory kindergarten and requires students to attend six years of primary school, with some of the children attending smaller, specialized classes. In Le Grand-Saconnex there were 321 students in kindergarten or primary school and 27 students were in the special, smaller classes. The secondary school program consists of three lower, obligatory years of schooling, followed by three to five years of optional, advanced schools. There were 321 lower secondary students who attended school in Le Grand-Saconnex. There were 445 upper secondary students from the municipality along with 64 students who were in a professional, non-university track program. An additional 285 students attended a private school.

As of 2000, there were 57 students in Le Grand-Saconnex who came from another municipality, while 868 residents attended schools outside the municipality.

In 2005 Campus des Nations, a campus of the International School of Geneva, was opened in Le Grand-Saconnex. Campus des Nations is one of three campuses of the International School of Geneva. The campus consists of two individual sites both located in Le Grand-Saconnex. The two sites, Pregny and Nations, collectively also known as the "Saconnex Campus" offer classes to students from year 1 through to year 13, providing both the Primary Years Program (PYP), Middle Years Program (MYP), and Diploma Program (DP), all as a part of the International Baccalaureate. The Nations site is in proximity with many notable international organizations, directly neighboring the International Labor Organization (ILO) headquarters, the World Health Organization (WHO) headquarters, and the World Council of Churches (WCC). The Pregny site is in the vicinity of the United Nations, as well as the Red Cross headquarters.

The International School of Geneva has a campus in Grand-Saconnex.

== International relations ==
The Portuguese consulate in Geneva is in Le Grand-Sacconex.

== Notable people ==
- Johann Jacob Schweppe (1740-1821), creator of the Schweppes drink
- Edouard Sarasin (1843–1917), independent scientist and mayor of Le Grand-Saconnex
- Jeanne Lombard (1865–1945), painter and drawer
- Bruno Boscardin (born 1970), former racing cyclist
