= Émilie Cozette =

French ballet dancer

Émilie Cozette (born 1981) is a French ballet dancer. She joined the Paris Opera Ballet in 1998, becoming a star (étoile) in 2007.

== Early life ==
Born in 1981, Cozette started to dance in Pont de l'Arche, Normandy, when she was just six years old. Although she was also interested in the piano, she opted to concentrate on ballet at the Conservatoire de Rouen, continuing at the Paris Opera Ballet School where she graduated in 1998.

== Career ==
At the age of 17, Cozette joined the Paris Opera Ballet. She rose quickly through the ranks, becoming a principal (première danceuse) in 2004 and an étoile in May 2007 after dancing in Rudolf Nureyev's Cinderella. Encouraged by Christiane Vaussard and Isabelle Guérin, her early solos included Clemence in Nureyev's Raymonda and the young girl in Jerome Robbins's Afternoon of a Faun. She has also played leading roles in La Bayadère, Don Quixote, Swan Lake, Giselle and George Balanchine's Rubies. She later danced the title role in Édouard Lock's AndréAuria and Calliope in Balanchine's Apollo.

Among her current roles are leads in Patrice Bart's La Petite danseuse de Degas, Maurice Béjart's Serait-ce la mort?, Merce Cunningham's Un Jour ou deux, Médée in Angelin Preljocaj's Le Songe de Médée and En Sol in Robbins' In the Night. She has performed with the troupe in Manchester, Vienna, Milan, San Francisco, Baalbek, São Paulo and Beijing.

Cozette retired from the Paris Opera Ballet on 21 September 2023 during the company's opening-night défilé.

== Awards ==
In 1998, Émilie Cozette won the junior award at the Paris International Dance Competition. She has since received the Cercle Carpeaux Prize (2001) and the AROP (2002). In 2007, Édouard Lock nominated her for the Prix Benois de la Danse.
