= Victor Gautier =

Swiss physician (1824–1890)

- Born: 1824; Geneva, Switzerland
- Died: 1890 (aged 65–66); Geneva, Switzerland
- Occupation: medical doctor
- Known for: President of the Medical Society of Geneva

Victor Gautier (1824–1890) was a Swiss medicak doctor. He served as President of the Medical Society of Geneva.

== Early life and education ==
Horace Charles Victor Gautier was born at Geneva in 1824.

He began his medical studies at Zurich in 1841. Two years later, he went to Paris, where, after working under Louis and other distinguished teachers of the day, he took his Doctor's degree in 1850, the subject of his inaugural thesis being Erectile Tumours of the Skin.

== Career ==
He soon afterwards returned to Geneva, where he practised every branch of medicine with equal success. He was at once one of the most trusted consultants in obscure medical cases, a surgeon of repute, and a recognised authority on obstetrics and gynaecology. His personal predilections were, however, for the last named department of practice. He was for many years medical director of the Plainpalais Infirmary for Women and Children, and lectured for some time on diseases of women in the University of Geneva.

He was President of the Medical Society of Geneva in 1858, and of the Section of Obstetrics and Gynecology at the International Medical Congress held in that city in 1877. He was also a vice-president of the Congress of Hygiene in 1882. He was also elected as a Corresponding Member of the Surgical Society of Paris and of the Obstetrical Society of Leipzig.

Gautier was considered to be a precursor of Sir Joseph Lister in the field of surgical antiseptics. In 1867, Gautier published a paper entitled "De la Cause Principale et de la Prophylaxie des Accidents consécutifs aux Opérations Chirurgicales", in which he insisted on the importance of the most scrupulous cleanliness in operations. "The sponges" (to quote his own words), "the appliances for dressings, the basins, must be washed and disinfected every time they have been used. Before the operation, the surgeon and each of his assistants should wash their hands with chlorinated water, soap, and a brush".

Gautier contributed largely to medical literature, his most important publications, besides those already mentioned, being papers on Retropharyngeal abscess, Rheumatism of the Uterus, Desquamation of the Tongue, Precocious Menstruation, and Puerperal Tetanus.

== Personal life ==
His wife served as president of the Ligue de femmes Suisses contre l'alcoolisme.

Victor Gautier died at Geneva on January 11, 1890, at the age of 66, of pleurisy and nephritis following influenza.
