= Vincent Landay =

Canadian-American film producer

- Born: Canada
- Occupation: Film producer
- Years active: 1988–present
- Known for: Collaborations with Spike Jonze; producer of Being John Malkovich, Her, Where the Wild Things Are

Vincent Landay is a Canadian-American film producer. He has worked with Spike Jonze on his music videos and feature films since 1993. Some of the movies he has produced include Being John Malkovich and Where the Wild Things Are, as well as the 2010 Canadian short film Higglety Pigglety Pop! or There Must Be More to Life, created for the Blu-ray release of Where the Wild Things Are. He has made music videos for Kanye West, REM, Jay Z and many more artists.

== Filmography ==
He was a producer in all films unless otherwise noted.

=== Film ===
Year	Film	Credit
1999	Being John Malkovich	
2002	Adaptation	
2009	Where the Wild Things Are	
2013	Her	
2018	Lords of Chaos	
2018	The Mountain	Executive producer
2018	Aniara	Executive producer
2019	The Report	Executive producer
2019	Judy and Punch	Executive producer
2019	Goldie	Executive producer
2021	Music	
2026	DreamQuil	

Production manager

Year	Film	Role
1993	Red Rock West	Post-production supervisor

Music department

Year	Film	Role
2021	Music	Score creative producer

Thanks

Year	Film	Role
1995	Seven	Special thanks
2001	Human Nature	Special thanks
2002	The Good Girl	Special thanks
2013	Wrong Cops	Special thanks

=== Television ===
Year	Title	Credit	Notes
2017	Budding Prospects	Executive producer	Television pilot
TBA	Vital Signs	Executive producer	

Miscellaneous crew

Year	Title	Role
1988−89	Moonlighting	Production assistant Production office assistant Office production assistant
1995	Double Rush	Producer: Opening title sequence

Second unit director or assistant director

Year	Title	Role	Notes
2017	Budding Prospects	Second unit director	Television pilot
