= Gustave Jeanneret =

Swiss painter (1847–1927)

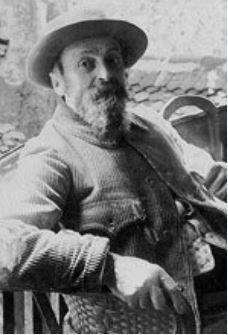
Gustave Jeanneret (1920s)

Gustave-Auguste Jeanneret (6 April 1847, Môtiers - 13 September 1927, Cressier) was a Swiss painter who produced mostly landscapes, genre scenes and still-lifes. He was also a ceramicist. His genre scenes generally depict people at work.

== Biography ==
His came from a family of merchants. He and his brother Georges (1848-19?) began studying art with their uncle, the painter and drawing teacher, Georges Grisel (1811-1877). His professional career began with an apprenticeship as a designer for Zuber & Cie, a decorative wallpaper manufacturer, at their office in Rixheim. In 1867, he moved to Paris, where he designed ceramics and studied painting at the Académie Suisse.

He adopted radical political beliefs and, shortly before the Commune, joined the "Chambre syndicale des dessinateurs sur étoffes"; part of the First International. His first exhibit at the Salon came in 1876.

In 1878, he returned to Switzerland and settled in Neuchâtel. There, he served as secretary of the Jura Federation and became an associate of the anarchist, James Guillaume.

In 1888, he married Emma Wolfrath, daughter of the printer and publisher, Henri Wolfrath, then purchased a former winemaker's shop in Cressier, where he set up a studio and attempted to introduce the modern styles of painting he had learned in Paris. Gustave Courbet and Camille Corot had been major influences. In the 1890s, he began to do Alpine landscapes.

Together with Eugène Burnand and Karl Alfred Lanz, he was a commissioner for the Swiss art department at the Exposition Universelle (1889). As a member of the "Gesellschaft Schweizerischer Maler und Bildhauer" he helped create a relief fund for indigent artists. From 1901 to 1905, he was a member of the "Eidgenössische Kunstkommission; serving as President from 1903 to 1904. In 1919, he was one of the founders of the "Fédération suisse des travailleurs intellectuels".

After his death, he was largely forgotten until a major retrospective was held at the Musée d'Art et d'Histoire (Neuchâtel) in 1998.

His son, Blaise Jeanneret (1897-1988) and daughter, Baucis de Coulon also became painters.

== Selected paintings ==
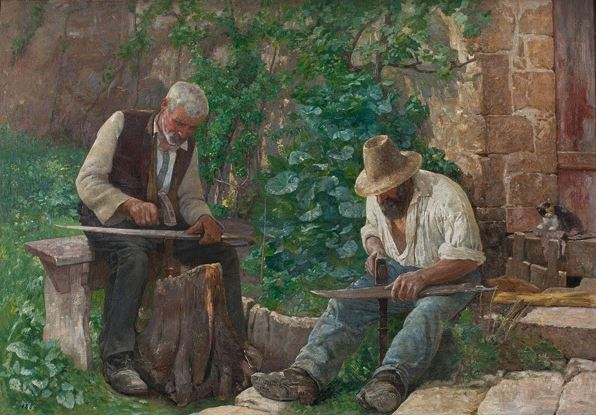
Men Working with Hammers

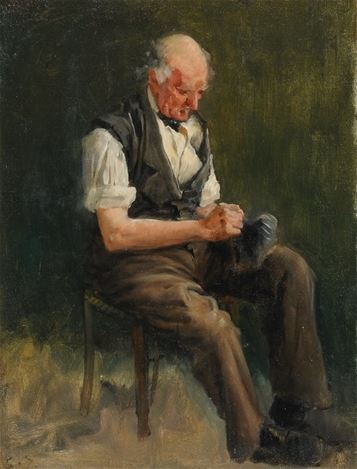
The Tailor

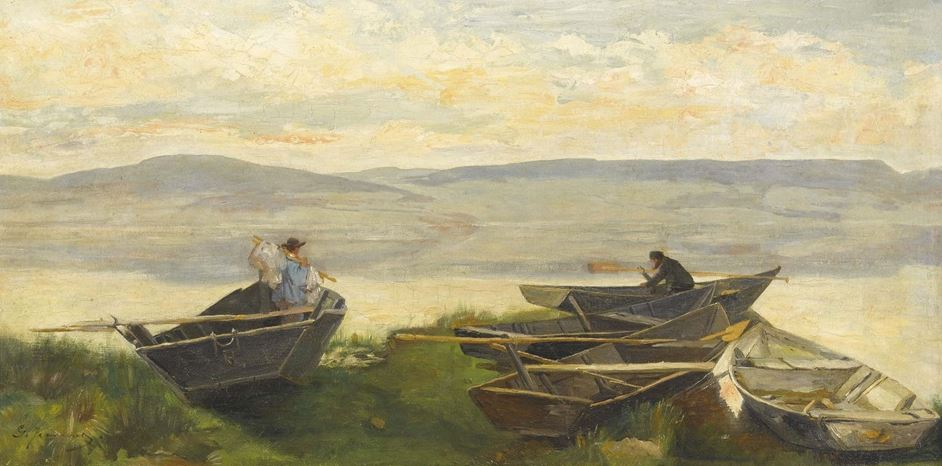
Fishing Boats on the Shores of Lake Neuchâtel

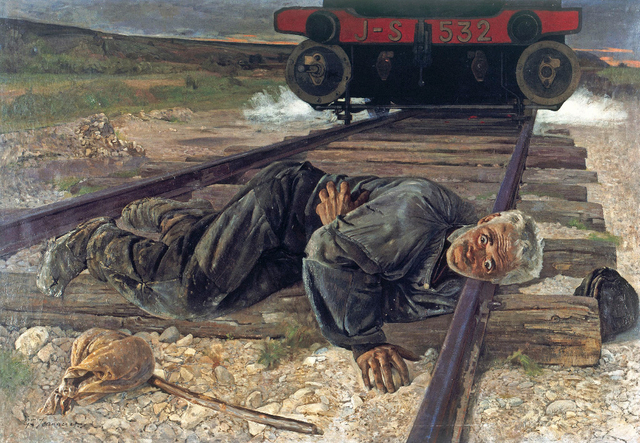
Without Hope

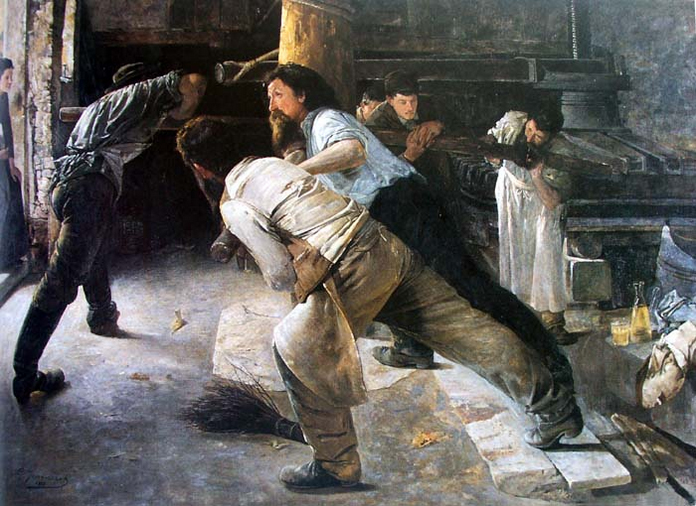
Wine Pressers
