= Vanessa Prager =

American artist (born 1984)

- Born: August 27, 1984 (age 41); Los Angeles, United States
- Occupation: Artist
- Website: vprager.com

Vanessa Prager (born August 27, 1984) is a Los Angeles–based American painter.

== Career ==
Vanessa Prager was born and raised in Los Angeles, California.

Known mainly for her large-scale, abstract oil paintings, Prager's main subject is the face. Perception, perspective and information flow are all central themes to her work, which became more widely recognized after her exhibition, Dreamers—a series of "imagined" portraits that cross the border between the figurative and the abstract—opened and sold out completely, in Spring 2015.

In January 2016, Prager's first solo exhibition in NYC, Voyeur, opened, with favorable reviews. The Huffington Post described the works as "densely layered paintings, with pigment applied so thickly it forms its own topography", elaborating that "various strokes of color—a ribbon of white like a squirt of toothpaste, a sharp sliver of green like a fish darting by—come together to form different visual narratives."

In 2015, W Magazine described Prager's paintings "sculptural" and stated that "nameless characters are barely visible up-close, but at distance they seem rise out of frantic ether like ghosts." In 2011, Prager painted still of Ryan Gosling, for The New York Times film Touch of Evil: Cinematic Villainy From the Year's Best Performers by photographer and filmmaker Alex Prager.

Currently Vanessa Prager is represented by Richard Heller, Los Angeles and The Hole, NYC.
