= Alfred Lanz =

Swiss painter and sculptor (1847–1907)

Karl Alfred Lanz
- Born: 25 October 1847; La Chaux-de-Fonds, Switzerland
- Died: 1 May 1907 (aged 59); Bern, Switzerland
- Known for: Sculpture, engraving

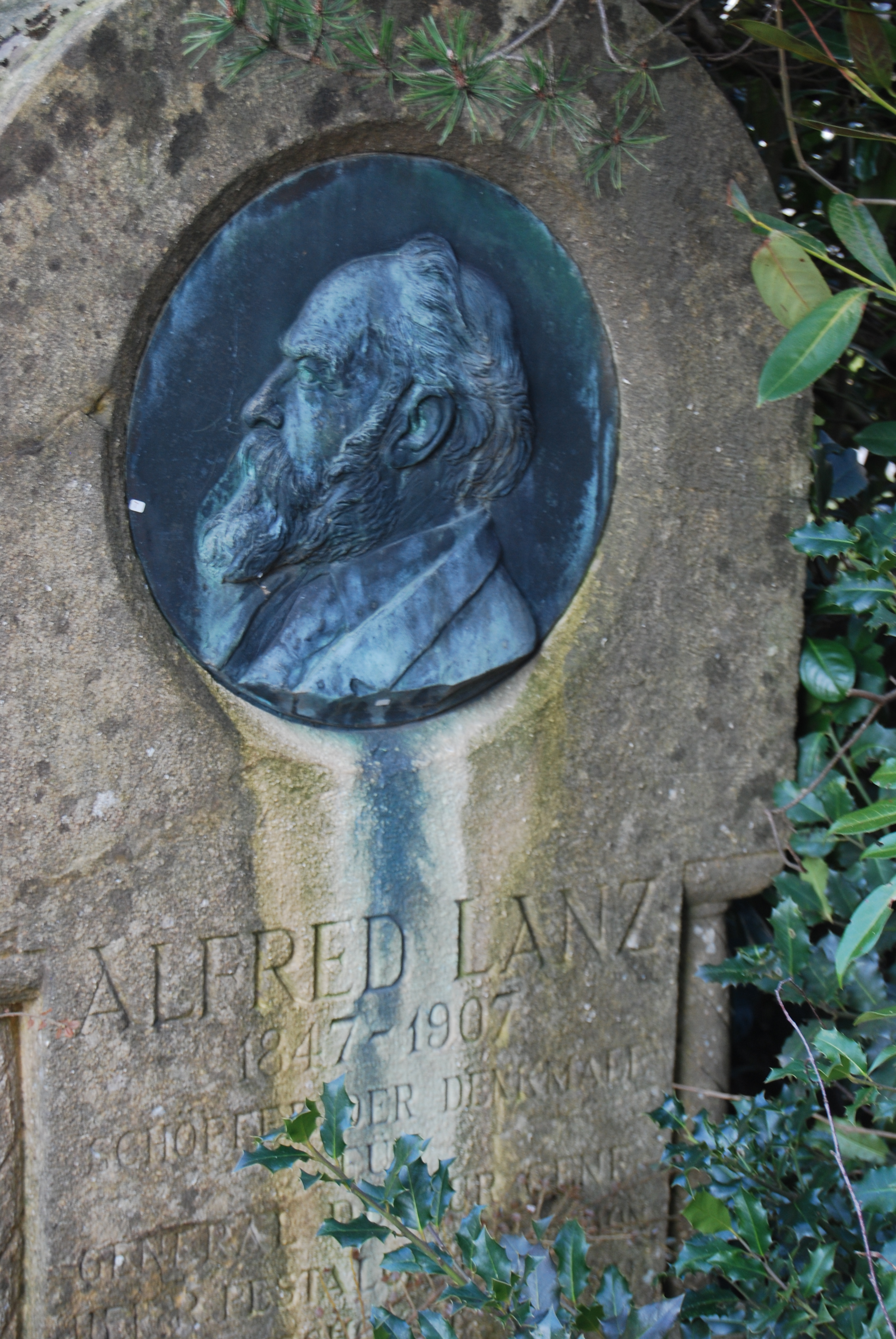
Memorial to Alfred Lanz in Rohrbach

Karl Alfred Lanz (25 October 1847 – 1 May 1907) was a Swiss sculptor and engraver. After training as an engraver in Biel, he studied sculpture at the Academy of Fine Arts in Munich and the École des Beaux-Arts in Paris. He worked on public monuments, portrait busts, grave monuments and architectural sculpture. His works included the General Dufour monument in Geneva, the Pestalozzi monument in Yverdon and allegorical figures for the Lucerne main post office.

== Biography ==
Karl Alfred Lanz was born in La Chaux-de-Fonds, Switzerland, on 25 October 1847. He trained as an engraver in Biel and became head of a workshop in 1871.

In 1872, Lanz studied at the Academy of Fine Arts in Munich under the sculptor Max von Widnmann. He later returned to engraving work in Biel before receiving a scholarship to study at the École des Beaux-Arts in Paris from 1875 to 1877, where he trained in the studio of Jules Cavelier.

Although Lanz carried out his commissions for Switzerland, he kept Paris as his permanent residence. He died in Bern on 1 May 1907.

== Work ==
Lanz worked as a sculptor and engraver, and his main fields included bronze and stone sculpture. For the General Dufour monument in Geneva, he submitted two designs and received first and second prize. The equestrian statue was unveiled in 1884.

The commission led to further public monuments, including the Pestalozzi monument in Yverdon in 1890, the Isaak Iselin monument in Basel in 1891 and the Heinrich Zschokke monument in Aarau in 1894. The Pestalozzi monument received a gold medal at the 1889 Exposition Universelle.

Lanz created architectural sculpture for the Kunstmuseum Bern, the Federal Palace and the University of Bern. His work in this field included four allegorical figures for the Lucerne main post office in 1888. In addition to public monuments, Lanz produced portrait busts and grave monuments for private patrons. His sculpture used a naturalistic style with close attention to surface detail.

== Gallery ==
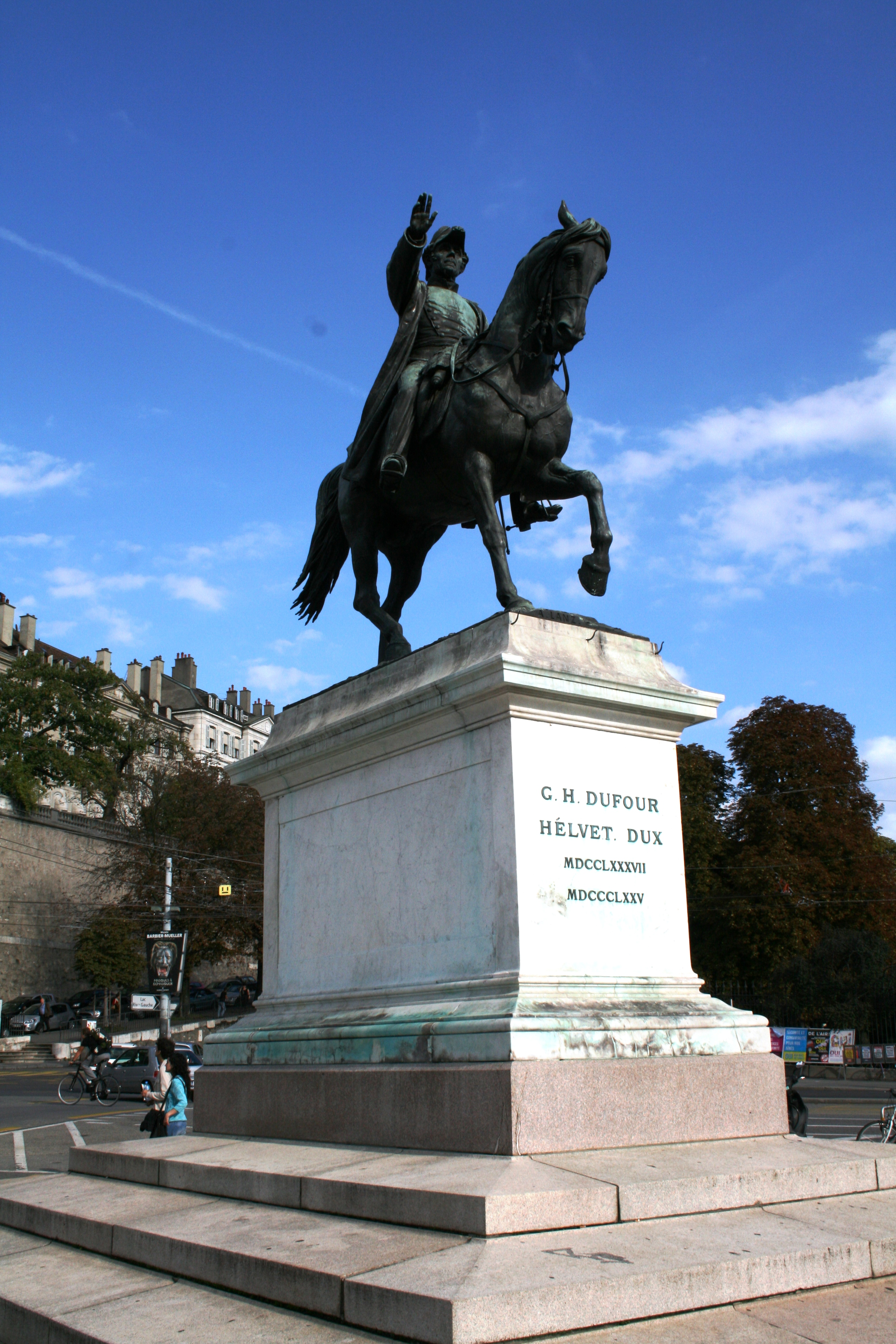
General Dufour monument in Geneva

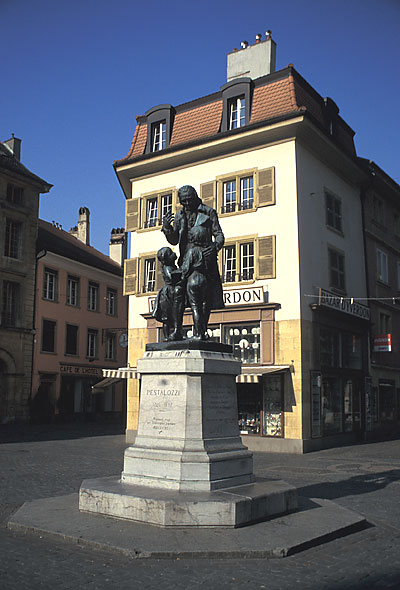
Pestalozzi monument in Yverdon

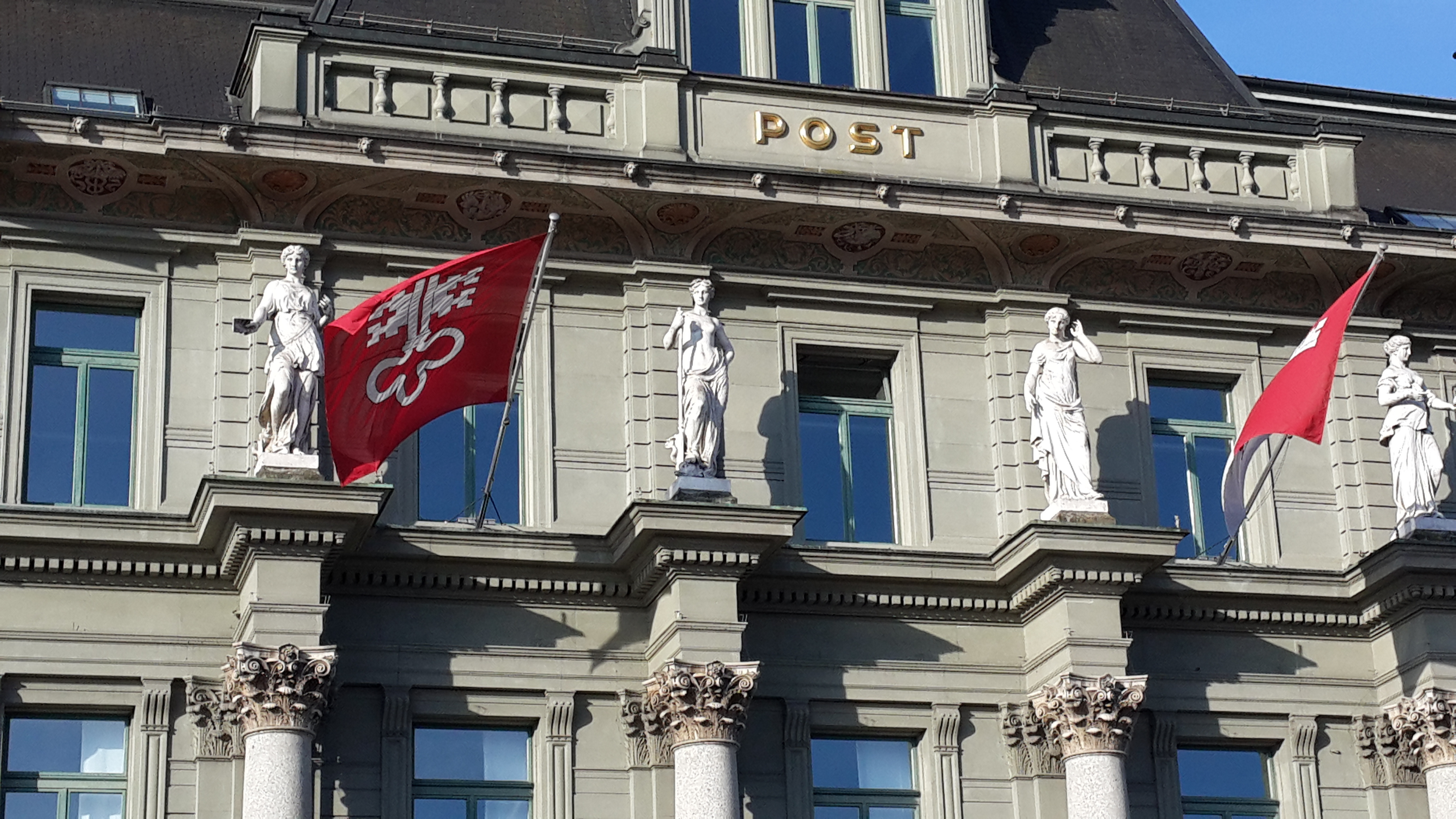
Allegorical figures on the facade of the Lucerne main post office
