= Christiane Vaussard =

French ballet dancer, teacher and choreographer

Christiane Vaussard (17 November 1923 – 4 August 2011) was a French ballet dancer, teacher and choreographer, and an Etoile with the Paris Opera Ballet.

Christiane Vaussard was born on 17 November 1923 at Neuilly-sur-Seine.

During her career, she worked with such ballet dancers as Zizi Jeanmaire, Roland Petit, Olga Preobrajenska, Boris Knyazev, Alexandra Balashova, Serge Lifar and Attilio Labis. Her career began in 1945 when she danced Coppélia with Bolshoi Ballet. In 1950 she appeared in Le Chevalier Errant and three years later danced in Variations, which was followed by her appearance in The Firebird in 1954. Other ballet appearances followed including the George Balanchine's Apollo, Symphony in C and Le baiser de la fée. In 1963 she retired from dancing and instead pursued career as a dance teacher and served as such from 1964 to 1993. From 1969 to 1989 Vaussard also served as a dance instructor at the Conservatoire de Paris and graduated such ballerinas as Élisabeth Platel, Isabelle Guerin, and Isabelle Ciaravola.

She died on 4 August 2011, aged 88.
