= Renée Bordier =

Swiss nurse and humanitarian activist (1902–2000)

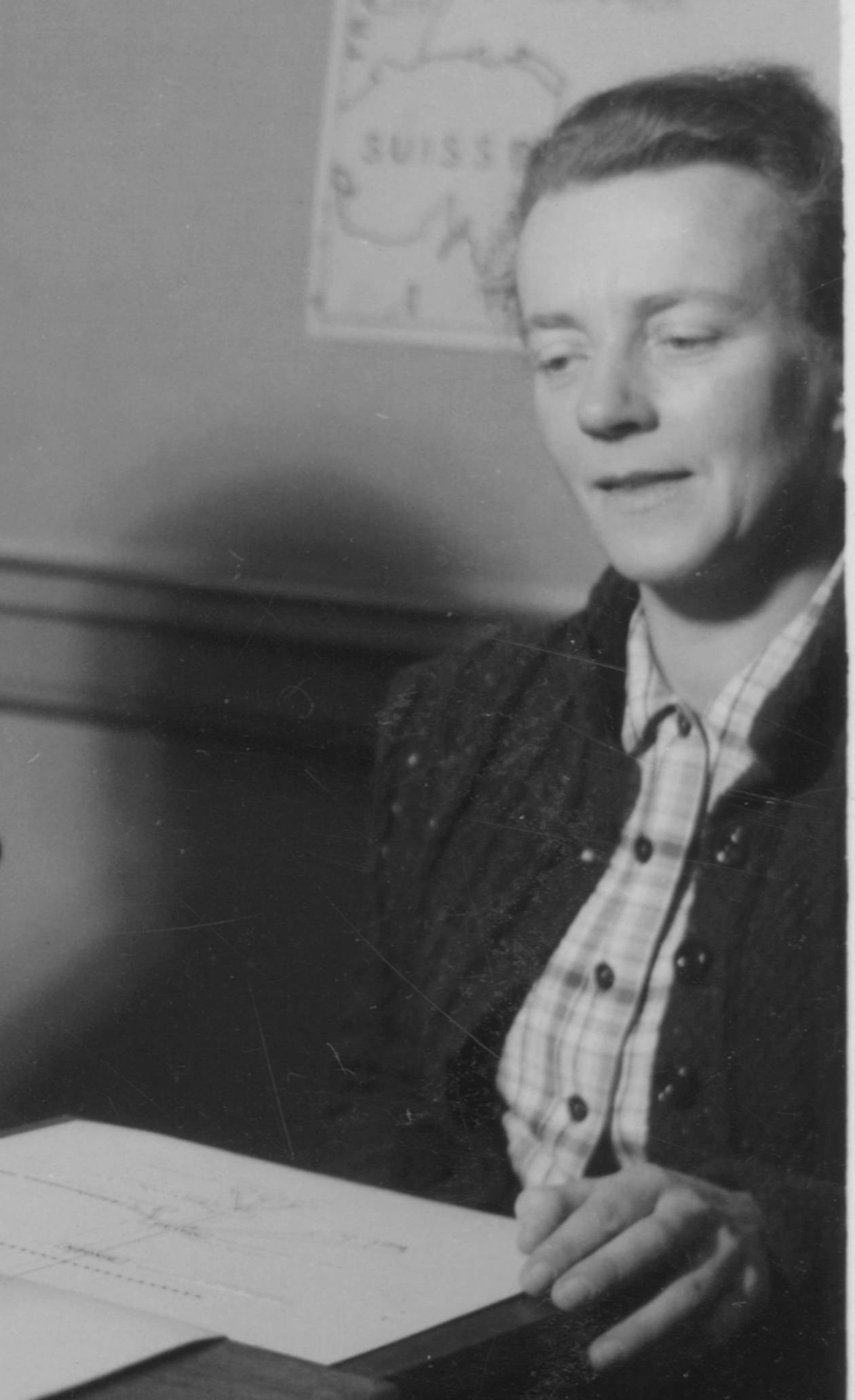
Bordier in 1942 (photo from the ICRC Archives

Renée Bordier (1 July 1902, Geneva – 2000) was a Swiss nurse from a patrician family background. She became a leading expert at the International Committee of the Red Cross (ICRC) for relief actions, especially during the Spanish Civil War (1936-1939). As only the fifth female member of the ICRC's governing body, Bordier helped pave the way towards gender equality in the organisation which itself has historically been a pioneer of international humanitarian law.

During the Second World War, she was an outspoken advocate within the ICRC leadership to publicly denounce the Holocaust by Nazi Germany through its system of extermination and concentration camps, though in vain.

== Life ==
=== Family background ===
The Bordiers are officially Geneva's fifth-oldest family. Their forefather Guillaume Bordier, a French protestant, originated from the Orléans region and fled in 1541 to the Calvinist republic of Geneva due to the religious persecution which arose in France after the 1534 Affair of the Placards. In 1571, the family obtained Genevan citizenship. Its members were at first active in the Fustian and Serge cloth trade, but later turned to gold-smithing and jewelry-making. Many of them became politicians, scientists, pastors, and army officers, respectively. As Geneva's patrician families lost their quasi-absolute control of the major public offices at the end of the 19th century, most of them got engaged in banking and philanthropic activities, including the Bordiers:

In 1871, Renée Bordier's paternal grandfather Ami Bordier (1841–1920) married Fanny Adèle Reverdin (1848-1933), the daughter of banker Jacques Reverdin, and joined Reverdin & Cie as a stockbroker. Upon the death of his father-in-law in 1895, Ami Bordier became the chairman of the bank and renamed it Bordier & Cie. It has remained since then an independent, international private bank specialised in wealth management for private clients. As of 2021, it was co-owned and -managed by the fifth generation of its founders.

Renée Bordier`s father Pierre Jacques (1872-1958) joined the bank as partner in 1897, as did seven years later his brother Édouard (1874-1957). In 1900, Pierre married Mathilde Perrier (1874-1966), who came from another rich family. The Bordiers traditionally resided in what was then still the village of Versoix, some 10 km north-east of the centre of Geneva on the north-west side of Lake Geneva. During the 19th century they owned almost half of the lands there. Both Renée's grandfather Ami and her father held the office of the mayor of the municipality.

Renée Bordier was born the second-oldest of five children. Her brothers Guillaume (1901-1982), Jacques (1903-1981) and Raymond (1906-1974) joined Bordier & Cie as partners, while her sister Marie (1908-1990) became the wife of a pastor in Jussy.

=== Professional career ===
==== Training and early career ====
Like many other daughters from prominent Genevan families Renée Bordier attended the Institut du Bon Secours, a nursing school which was founded in 1905 by the physician Marguerite Champendal, the first woman from Geneva to obtain her doctorate in medicine at the University of Geneva. In 1925, Bordier graduated with a diploma as a nurse. She at first worked in private care, then as a nurse for children in a boarding school. For two years, she was the director of a maternity hospital and then started working again as a nurse, this time in an operating theatre. In 1936, she became the chief nurse at Bon Secours.

==== ICRC member (1938-1948) ====
In early 1938, the ICRC assembly voted to appoint Bordier as one of its three new members. The election was an effort to rejuvenate the governing body of the organisation with regard to growing global tensions. 75 years after the founding of the ICRC, Bordier became only its fifth-ever female member after the historian and legal scholar Renée-Marguerite Cramer (1887-1963), who was elected in 1918 and succeeded in 1922 by the nurse and suffragette Pauline Chaponnière-Chaix (1850-1934). The third female member was the music educator Suzanne Ferrière (1886-1970) in 1925, followed in 1930 by the nurse Lucie Odier (1886-1984). Like most of her colleagues, both female and male, Bordier was connected to the ICRC through elder relatives: her uncle Guillaume Pictet (1860-1926), a banker from Geneva's oldest family, had been a member of the ICRC from 1919 until 1921.

At the ICRC, Bordier worked at first in organising relief for the victims of the Spanish Civil War (1936-1939). She did so in close cooperation with Odier, who hailed likewise from a prominent family of bankers (Bank Lombard Odier & Co). During the Second World War, Bordier became the director of the ICRC service for individual aid to prisoners of war (POW).

By the autumn of 1942, the ICRC leadership received information about the systematic extermination of Jews by Nazi Germany in Eastern Europe, the so-called Final Solution. A large majority of the ICRC's about two dozen members at its general assembly on 14 October 1942 – especially its four female members Frick-Cramer, Odier, Ferrière, and Bordier – was in favour of a public protest. However, Carl Jacob Burckhardt – a professor of history at the Graduate Institute of International Studies in Geneva who went on to become the ICRC president in 1944 – and Switzerland's President Philipp Etter firmly denied that request.

In late 1944, the Norwegian Nobel Committee announced that it awarded the ICRC its second Nobel Peace Prize after 1917. As in World War I, it was the only recipient during the war years. While the then leadership of the ICRC was later sharply criticized for not publicly denouncing Nazi Germany, Bordier all the more made her distinct contribution to what the Nobel Committee credited the ICRC with, i.e.

«the great work it has performed during the war on behalf of humanity.»

In 1945, Bordier was elected as president of the Association du Bon Secours, where she had graduated as a nurse two decades earlier. She took over the office at a time when the institution was facing a severe crisis, particularly from a lack of funds and recruitment. With support from Max Huber (1874-1960), who was the ICRC president from 1928 to 1944, Bordier succeeded in securing financial assistance from the Rockefeller Foundation. Still in 1946 she stepped down from the presidency of the association. In January 1948, Bordier also handed in her resignation as ICRC member. The leadership of the organisation praised her achievements in a text published by the Revue Internationale de la Croix-Rouge:

«With modesty and a lot of patience, the energetic and persevering Miss Bordier devoted herself entirely to the accomplishment of the duties she had assumed, reviving by her action the hope in the hearts of those she was helping.»

=== Later life ===
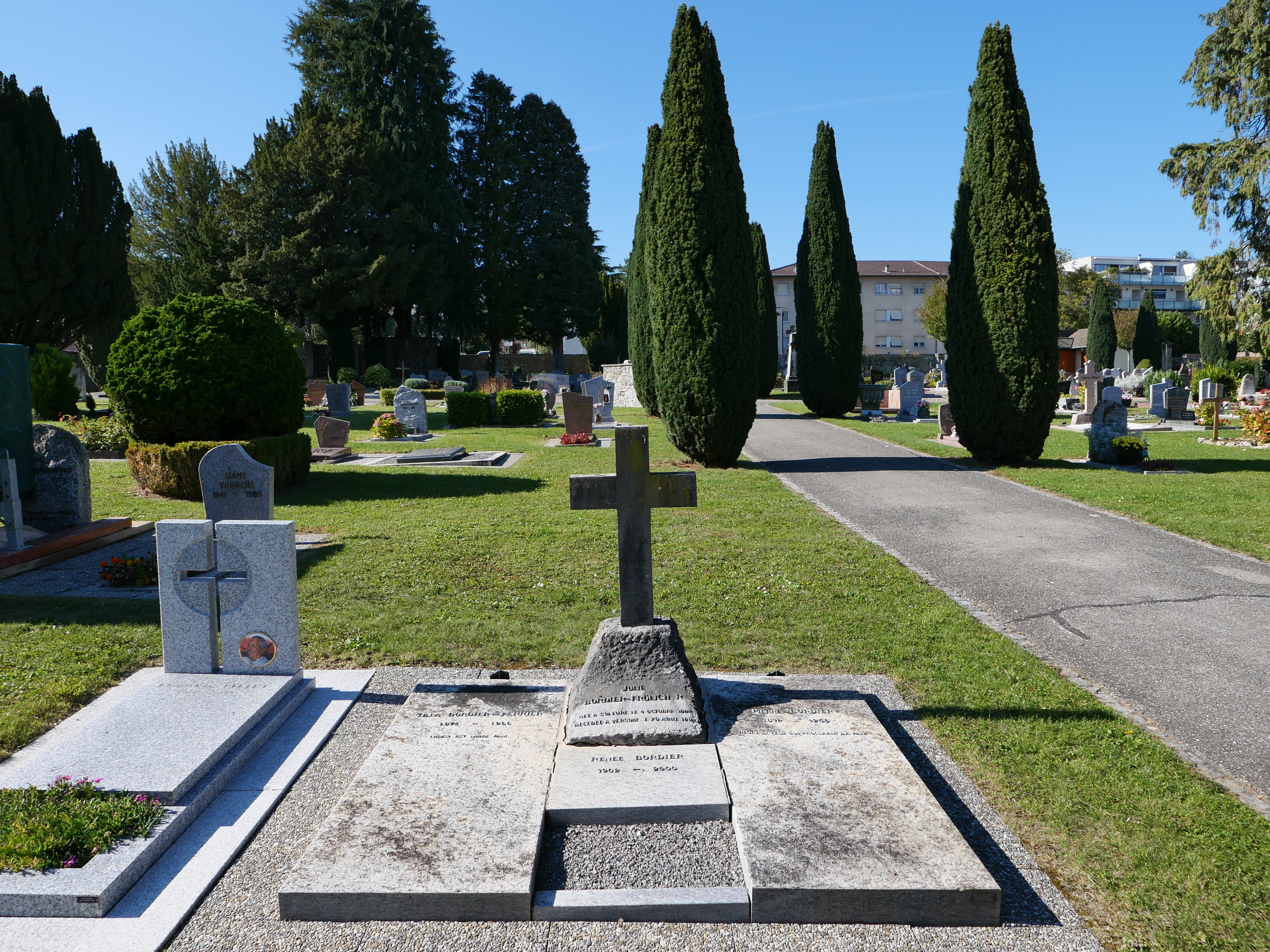
Bordier's epitaph (centre)

While Bordier's elder brother Guillaume was appointed to become an ICRC member in 1955 (and ICRC vice-president in 1966/67), little has been published about her later activities which focused on local child welfare. She was supported in this by Maria Mościcka (1896-1979), the widow of Ignacy Mościcki (1867-1946), who was the president of Poland when Germany invaded the country in 1939. Bordier hosted Mościcka in her estate at Chemin des Colombiere 12 in Versoix until the death of the destitute exile and became her testamentary executor. In that role, she approved in 1984 of Mościckin's and Mościcka's exhumation when the descendants of the former president requested that the remains be moved from Versoix to Warsaw. The Polish authorities agreed to a private funeral without any state ceremonies, but the authorities of the canton of Geneva withdrew their agreement after protests from Polish emigrants. It was only in 1993 that the remains of the couple were buried at the Powązki Cemetery.

Bordier and her sister Marie donated their estate in Versoix in the early 1980s to the canton of Geneva under the unalienable condition that it would be used for child welfare. It became the school "Les Vignes" ("The Vines") for under-privileged children.

Bordier is buried at the cemetery of Versoix in a family grave with her parents and her great-grandmother Julie née Frölicher (1802-1884).
