= Marguerite Frick-Cramer =

Swiss legal scholar, historian and humanitarian activist

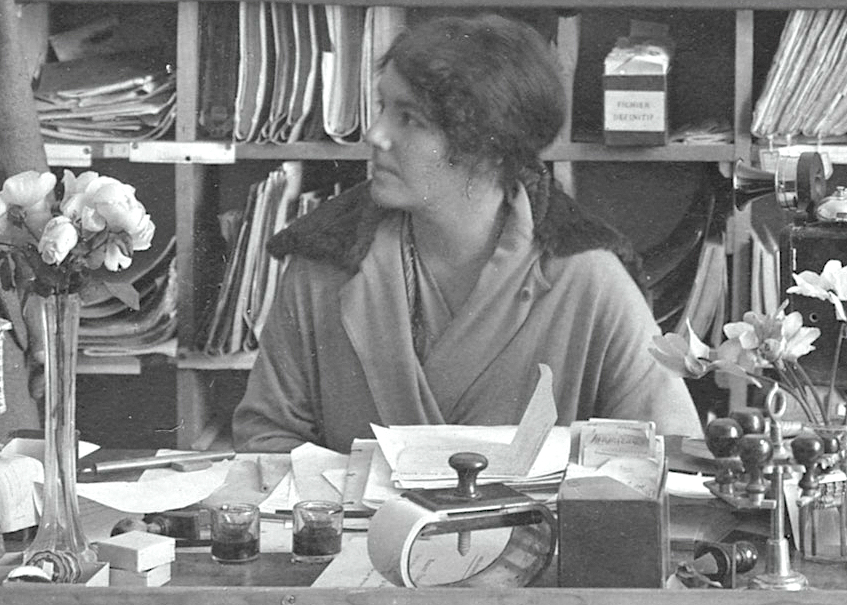
- Cramer at the International Prisoners-of-War Agency during WWI
- Born: 28 December 1887; Geneva, Switzerland
- Died: 22 October 1963 (aged 75); Geneva, Switzerland
- Scientific career
- Fields: History, International Humanitarian Law

Signature
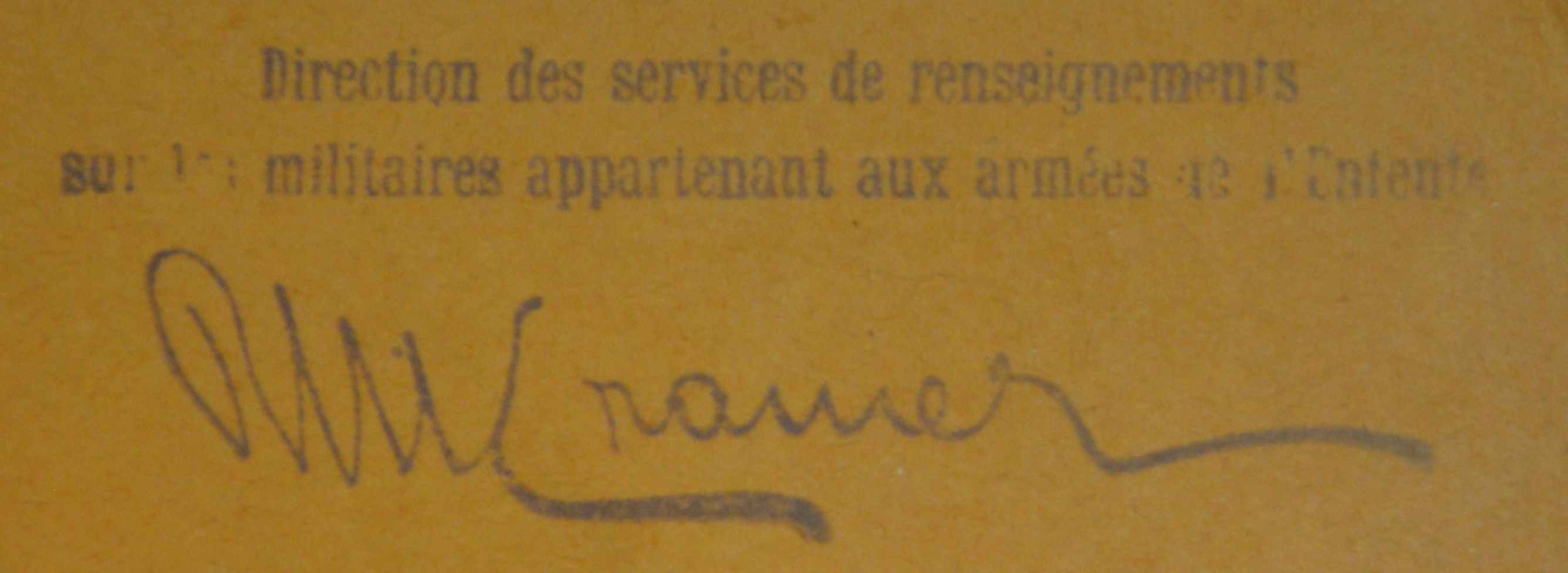

Marguerite "Meggy" Frick-Cramer (28 December 1887 – 22 October 1963), born Renée-Marguerite Cramer, was a Swiss legal scholar, historian, and humanitarian activist. She was the first woman to sit on the governing body of an international organization, when she was made a member of the board of the International Committee of the Red Cross (ICRC) in 1918.

In 1910, she became the third woman in Switzerland to obtain the license for working as an advocate. In 1917, she became the first ever female delegate of the ICRC, and the first ever female member of its governing body in 1918. Simultaneously, she became the first female historian to become a deputy professor in Switzerland. As the first woman to co-draft a Geneva Convention in 1929, Frick-Cramer was a pioneer for gender equality in the development of international humanitarian law.

During the reign of Nazism in Germany, and especially during the Second World War, she became an outspoken advocate inside the ICRC leadership, publicly denouncing Nazi Germany's systems of concentration and extermination camps.

== Biography ==
=== Family background, education and early career ===
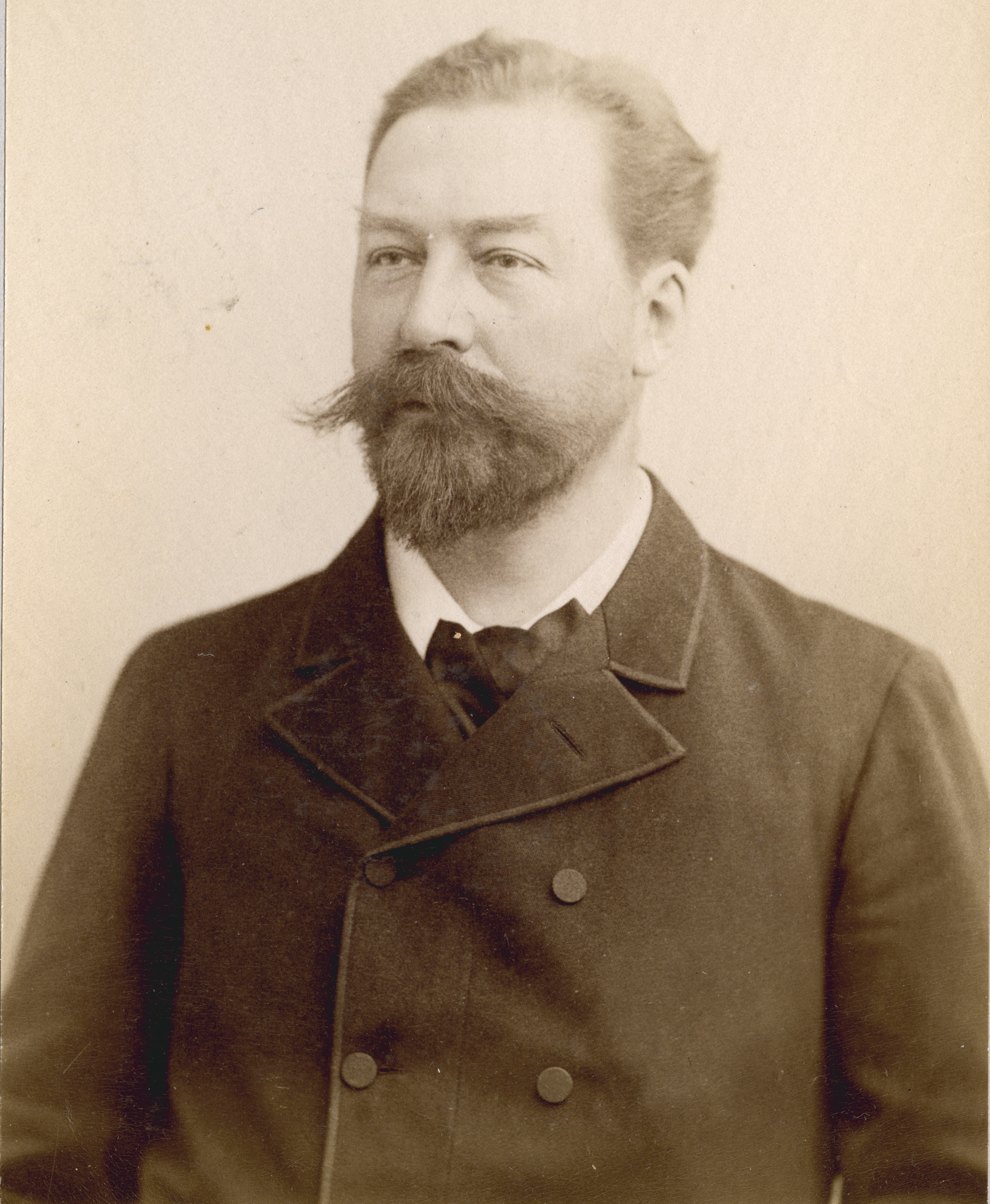
Louis Micheli (image from the audiovisual collections of the ICRC Archives)

Cramer's family on the paternal side likely originated from what is now Germany and acquired the citizenship of the Republic of Geneva in 1668. Her father Louis Cramer was a theatre director, who also became the president of the Calvinist ecclesiastical court of the Protestant Church of Geneva. Her mother, Eugénie Léonie Micheli, hailed from another Patrician family which established itself in Geneva shortly before the Cramer family. Cramer's maternal grandfather Louis Micheli (1836-1888), who was a rich agronomist and a gentleman farmer, became a member of the ICRC in 1869, just six years after its founding, and served as its vice-president from 1876 until his death. After losing control of the major public offices in Geneva, his Patrician class turned to banking and philanthropic activities at the end of the 19th century,

Cramer studied law in Geneva and Paris, graduating from the University of Geneva in 1910. In the mid-1910s, she became the third woman in Switzerland to obtain the license for working as an advocate. However, she did not practise the profession and instead turned her interest on researching constitutional law and the history of Switzerland, earning her doctorate in that field. Cramer published a number of works on the principal of nationality, the prosecution of juveniles, and various aspects of Genevan history, for which she was awarded the prestigious Prix Ador in 1911 and 1913. Her best known book became Genève et les Suisses which she published in 1914 to commemorate the centenary of Geneva joining the Swiss Confederation. It was supervised by Professor Charles Borgeaud, who was one of her relatives.

=== First World War ===
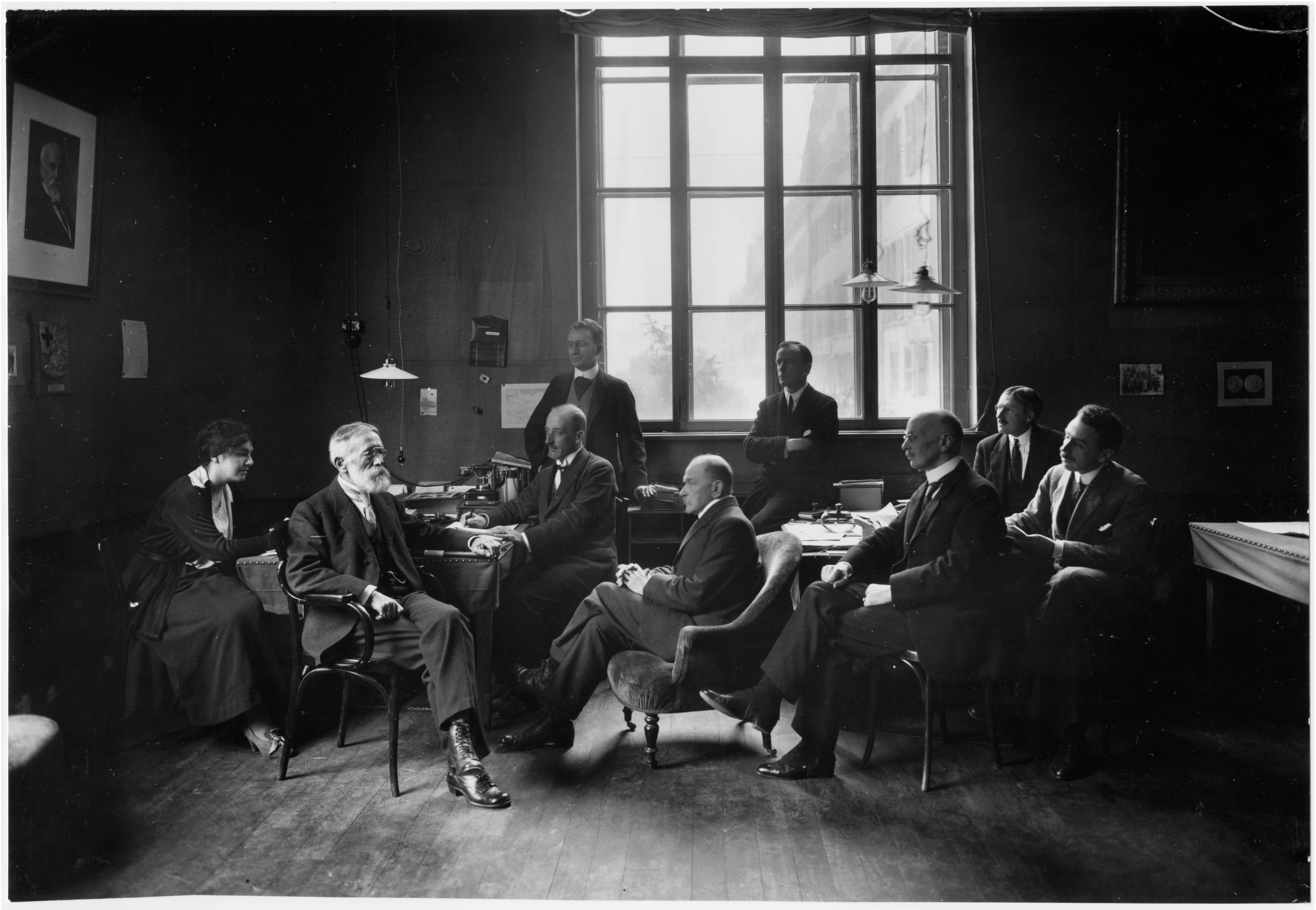
Group Portrait with Lady: Cramer (left) with the male IPWA directors

Shortly after the outbreak of the First World War, in 1914, the ICRC, under its president Gustave Ador, established the International Prisoners-of-War Agency (IPWA) to trace prisoners of war (POWs) and to re-establish communications with their respective families.

Portraits by Frédéric Boissonnas
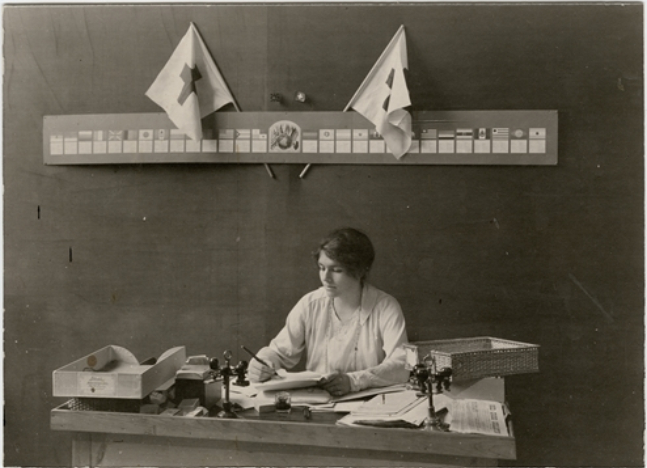
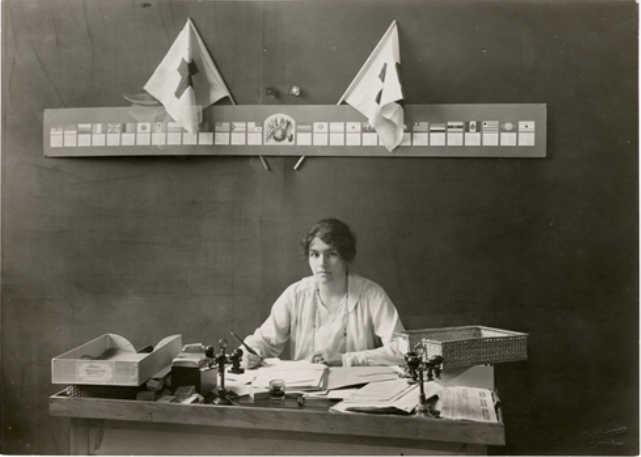
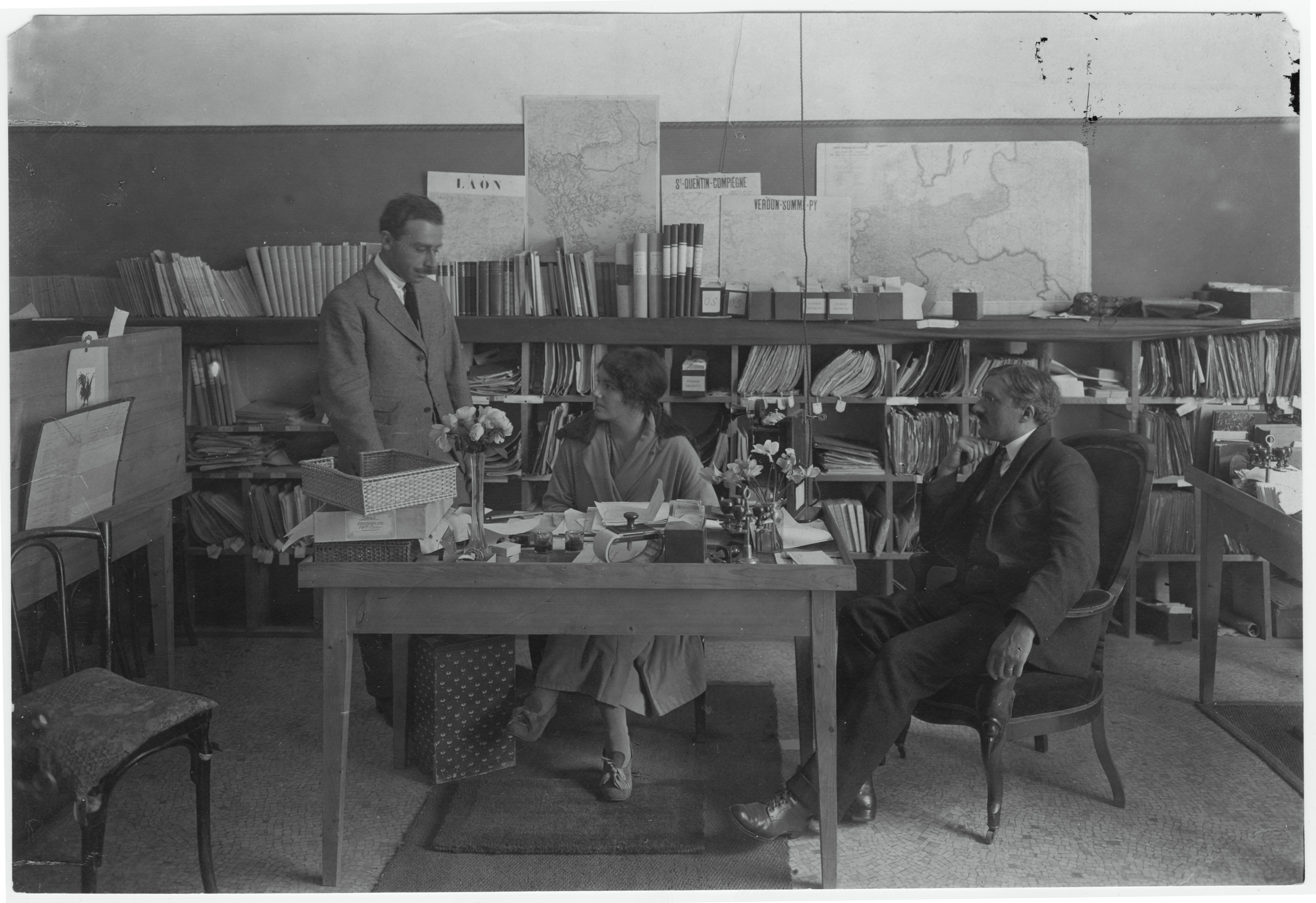

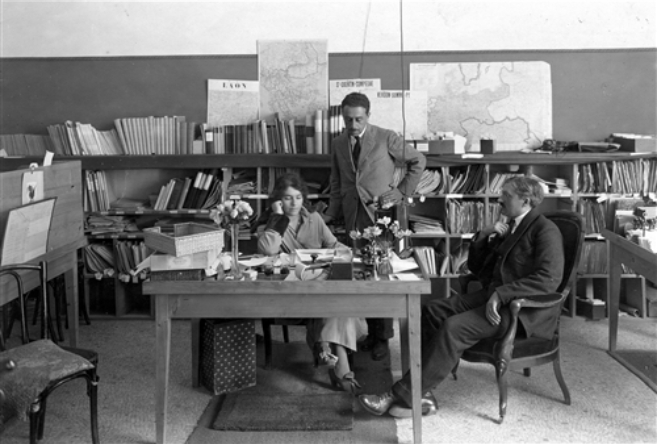
With her fellow directors Jacques Chenéviere and Étienne Clouzot (right)

By the end of that same year, the Agency had some 1,200 volunteers who worked in the Musée Rath, most of whom were women. Cramer had been involved from the creation of the Agency and thus pursued the family tradition established by her maternal grandfather Louis Micheli who was one of the first members of the ICRC: her uncle Horace Micheli, and three of her cousins – Lucien Cramer, Maurice-Alexandre "Alec" Cramer, and Jacques-Barthélémy Micheli – served likewise at the IWPA. The same is true for a step-relative, Guillaume Pictet, who hailed from Geneva's oldest family. Soon she shared the direction of the Entente department with the writer Jacques Chenevière, who wrote in his memoirs that Cramer's "organizational ability wrought miracles."

According to ICRC historian Daniel Palmieri, it was Cramer's idea to cope with the big data about individual fates by introducing a system of index cards linked to catalogues.

Cramer also fundraised for the under-financed agency: in spring of 1916 she performed a play with a number of colleagues titled Le Château historique! ("the historical palace!"), a comedy in three acts by Alexandre Bisson and Julien Berr de Turique. Cramer played the heroine Marguerite Baudoin. The performance raised some 3,000 Swiss francs.

In December 1916, Cramer and her colleague Marguerite van Berchem went to Frankfurt to convince the local Red Cross there to stop doing work that was already done in Geneva.

Between March and April 1917, Cramer officially became the first female delegate of the ICRC when she was sent on a mission to Berlin, Copenhagen, and Stockholm. In October of the same year, she went on another mission to Paris and in December, she took part in the Franco-German conferences which the ICRC organised in Bern upon the request of the Swiss government in order to negotiate the repatriation of POWs. Still in the same year, the ICRC was awarded its first Nobel Peace Prize – the only prize awarded during the war years – to which Cramer arguably made her own contribution as well. At this time, Cramer was unhappy with some of the internal ICRC structures:

"In March 1918, Renée-Marguerite announced she would resign from the Agency. When she eventually changed her mind, she insisted that the ICRC set up permanent delegations in the different belligerent countries and allowed the Agency's heads of departments to sit in the Committee's meetings."

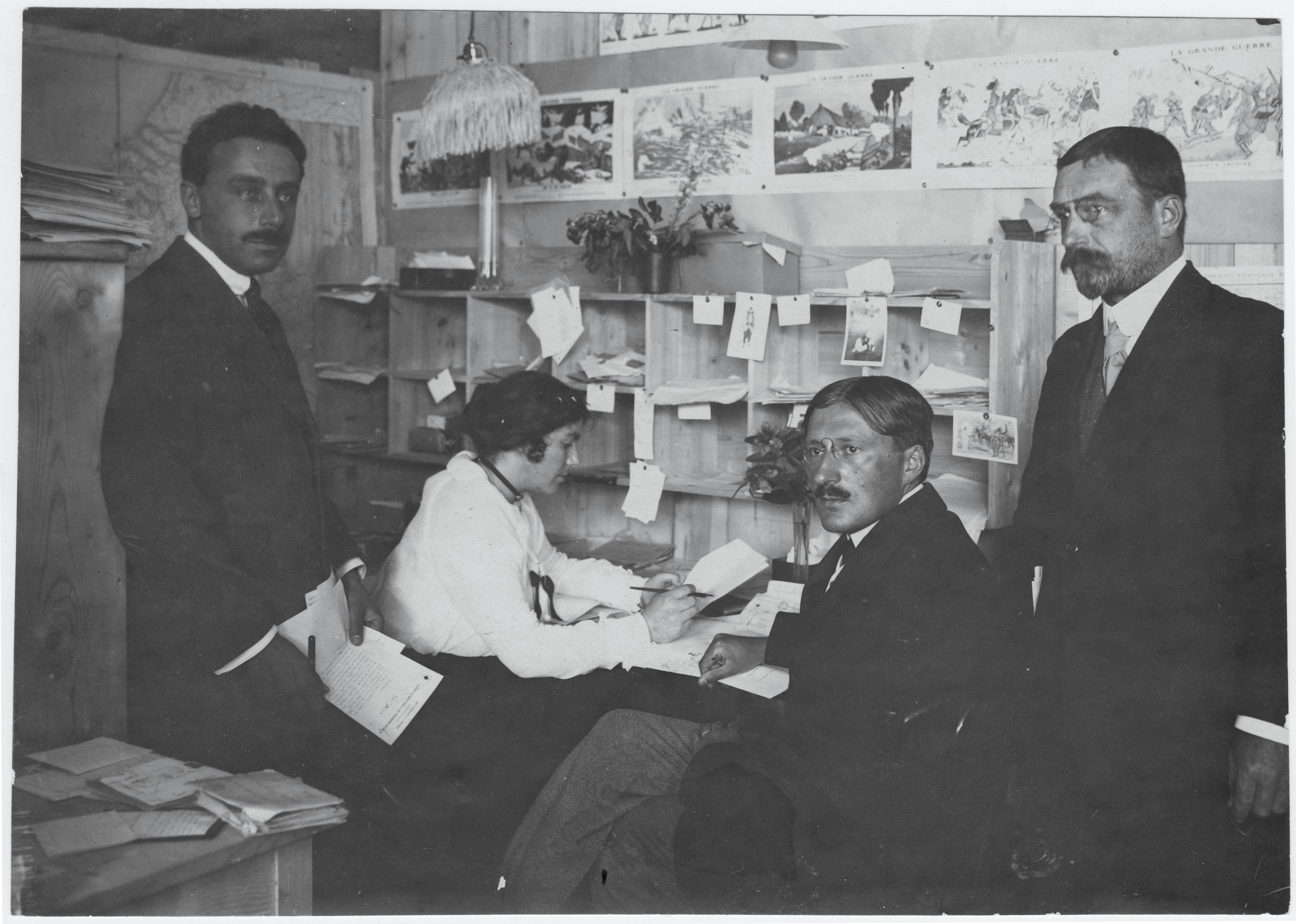
With Chenevière and Clouzot

In June 1918, the Egyptologist Edouard Naville - who was the ICRC President ad interim, since Gustave Ador was elected to the Swiss Federal Council in 1917 - recommended the appointment of Cramer as a member of the committee, which at the time was made up exclusively of men. Naville, who hailed from Geneva's second-oldest family, pointed to "her qualifications and service", but also emphasized that a woman's presence "would only serve to honor and strengthen" the committee.

However, her candidacy was delayed due to tensions between the ICRC and some national Red Cross societies: firstly, about the ICRC policy of only recruiting Swiss nationals – and mainly from Geneva's Patrician families. Secondly, specific tensions had arisen between Cramer and representatives from the United States of America in 1917. They revolved around the issue that the American Red Cross set up an agency for US-POWs in Bern, which made Cramer worry about crucial information becoming dispersed.

=== Between the World Wars ===
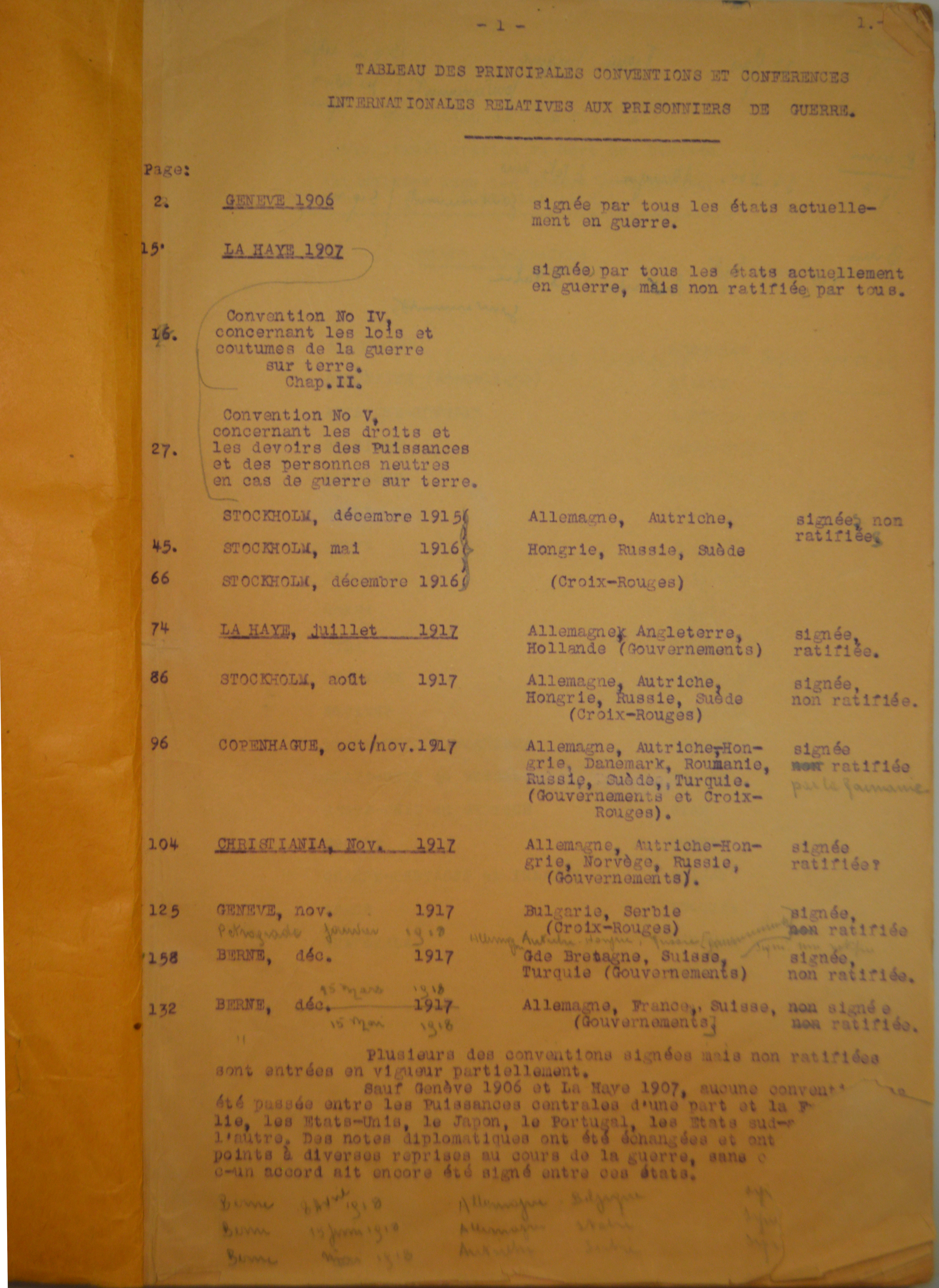
Manuscript on POW conventions, signed and annoted by Cramer, from the collections of the ICRC Library

Still, in 1918, the University of Geneva offered Cramer a deputy professorship to substitute for her former supervisor Charles Borgeaud and to teach the history of Geneva. He was busy working on a memorandum concerning Swiss neutrality, which the Swiss government presented to the conference about the Treaty of Versailles. Her career as an academic was short-lived, and she took up new responsibilities at the ICRC before finishing her first semester as a lecturer.

On 27 November 1918, two and a half weeks after the end of the War, Cramer was co-opted as a member of the ICRC. She was related to seven other committee members. Despite the hesitations some of its members felt in allowing a woman to join its ranks, the Committee understood that such change would be inevitable, largely because the war had deeply altered people's perception of gender equality. As a result, Cramer became the first woman to become a member of the governing body of any international organization, more than fifty years before the introduction of women's suffrage in Switzerland.

When representatives from the National Red Cross Societies of the Allies/Entente Powers came together in Cannes and Paris to establish the League of Red Cross Societies, Cramer was sent by the committee to join the negotiations.

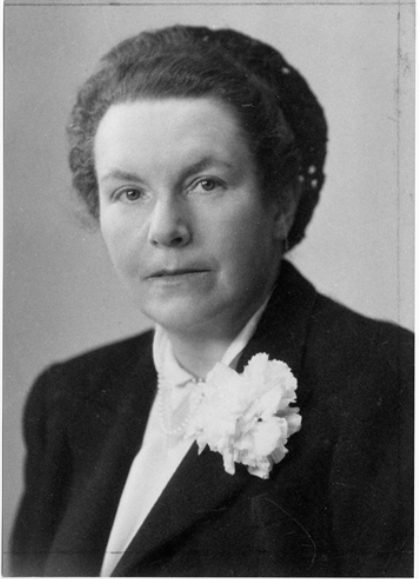
Frick-Cramer, portrayed once more by Frédéric Boissonnas

In 1920, Cramer married Edouard Auguste Frick, a Swiss citizen who was born in Saint Petersburg and served as the ICRC general delegate for Eastern Europe, most notably during the Russian Revolution and later as a deputy for Fridtjof Nansen when he became the High Commissioner for Refugees of the League of Nations. Cramer and Frick had dealt with each other on a professional basis before their wedding.

Frick-Cramer moved to Germany and resigned from her ICRC membership in December 1922, when she realised that she could not follow the affairs of the ICRC properly from such a distance. She was succeeded by the nurse, feminist, and suffragette Pauline Chaponnière-Chaix (1850-1934).

Frick-Cramer was made an honorary member, and continued to dedicate her activities to the development of international humanitarian law: her focus became the extension of international conventions to protect both military and civil victims of war. She became one of the principal actors involved in the writing of the 1929 Geneva Convention about the treatment of prisoners of war. During a diplomatic conference in July of that year, Frick-Cramer was the only female expert participant and as such the first woman to co-draft a Geneva Convention. The treaty was considered a partial success as its implementation depended on the goodwill of the warring parties.

She also played a key role in the "Tokyo-project" which aimed to provide protection for civilians of "enemy" nations caught up in the territory of an opposing war party. In October 1934, she, along with van Berchem and their colleague Lucie Odier, attended the 15th international conference of the Red Cross Movement in Tokyo on behalf of the ICRC. Frick-Cramer presented a draft text which prohibited repression, deportation, and execution of hostages, granting civilian detainees the same protections as prisoners of war. The conference approved of the draft and commissioned the ICRC to organise a diplomatic conference in which to ratify it. Due to objections from the British and French governments, the conference never went ahead.

Due to the emerging system of concentration camps in Nazi Germany, the ICRC decided in March 1935 to transform its working group for civilians into one for political prisoners. Frick-Cramer was a member of both the former and the latter. In September 1935, during a meeting of the ICRC leadership in which the organization's attitude towards the system was discussed before the visit of a delegation, "the two women in the meeting, Suzanne Ferrière and Renée-Marguerite Frick-Cramer, stated that the ICRC should at least do everything to give news to the families of the inmates." However, the delegation led by Carl Jacob Burckhardt ultimately reported only a "mild critique" to its Nazi hosts.

=== Second World War ===
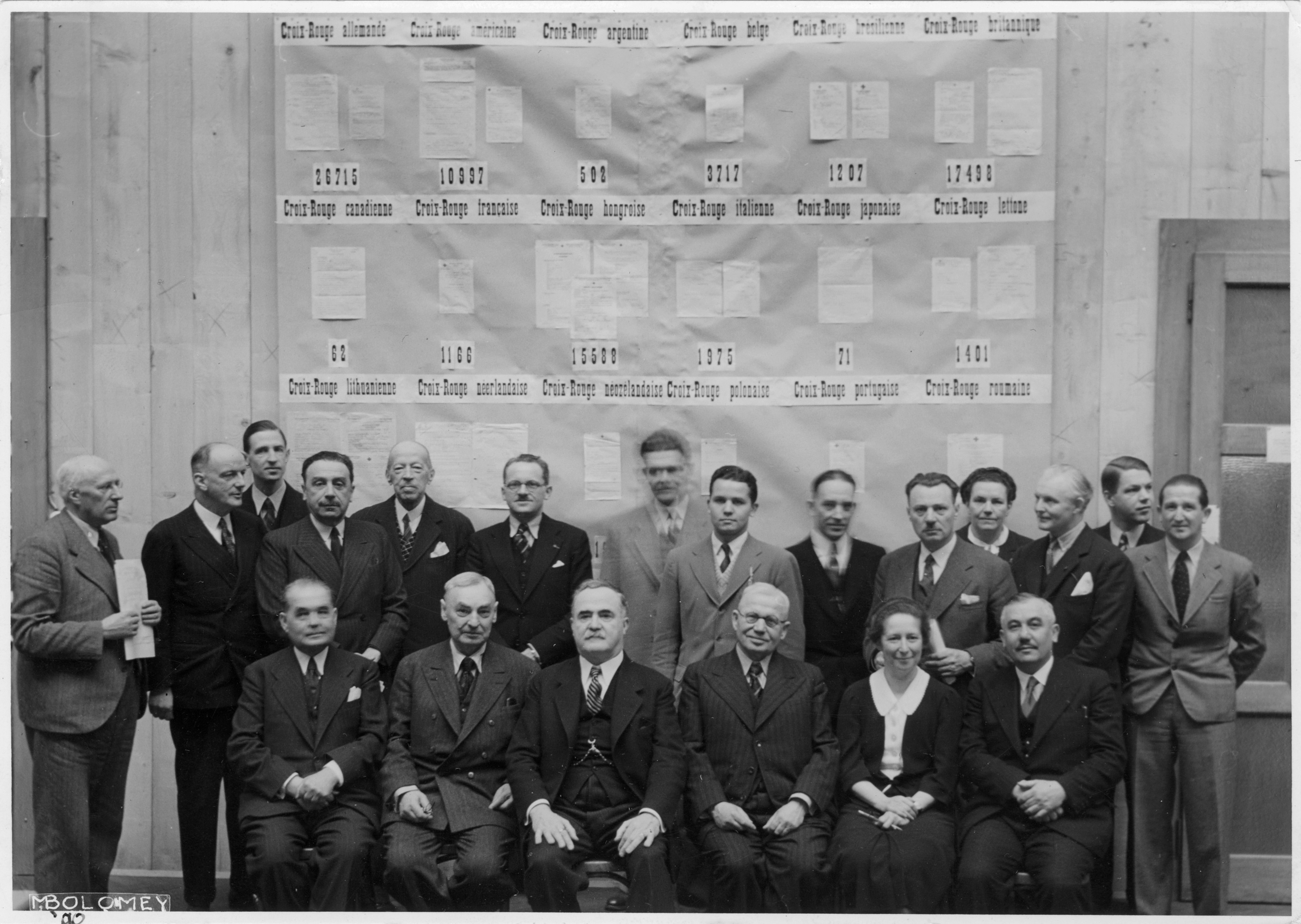
Group Portrait with two Ladies: Frick-Cramer in the back-row, fourth from the right, and Lucie Odier, second from right in the front-row with Huber third from left, during a meeting with representatives of national Red Cross societes from non-belligerent countries(1940)

Shortly after the beginning of the Second World War, the ICRC set up the Central Agency for Prisoners of War. It was the successor of the IPWA and based on the 1929 Geneva Convention which Frick-Cramer had helped to create. In September 1939, she was once again elected as a regular member of the ICRC, as opposed to the honorary membership she held for the previous 17 years. Subsequently, she held the dossier for civilians and deported persons. Following the German invasion of Poland, Frick-Cramer repeatedly lobbied Burckhardt - who went on to become the ICRC president in 1944 - to urge the Nazi regime for permission to establish a permanent ICRC delegation in Krakow, but supposedly he ignored her requests.

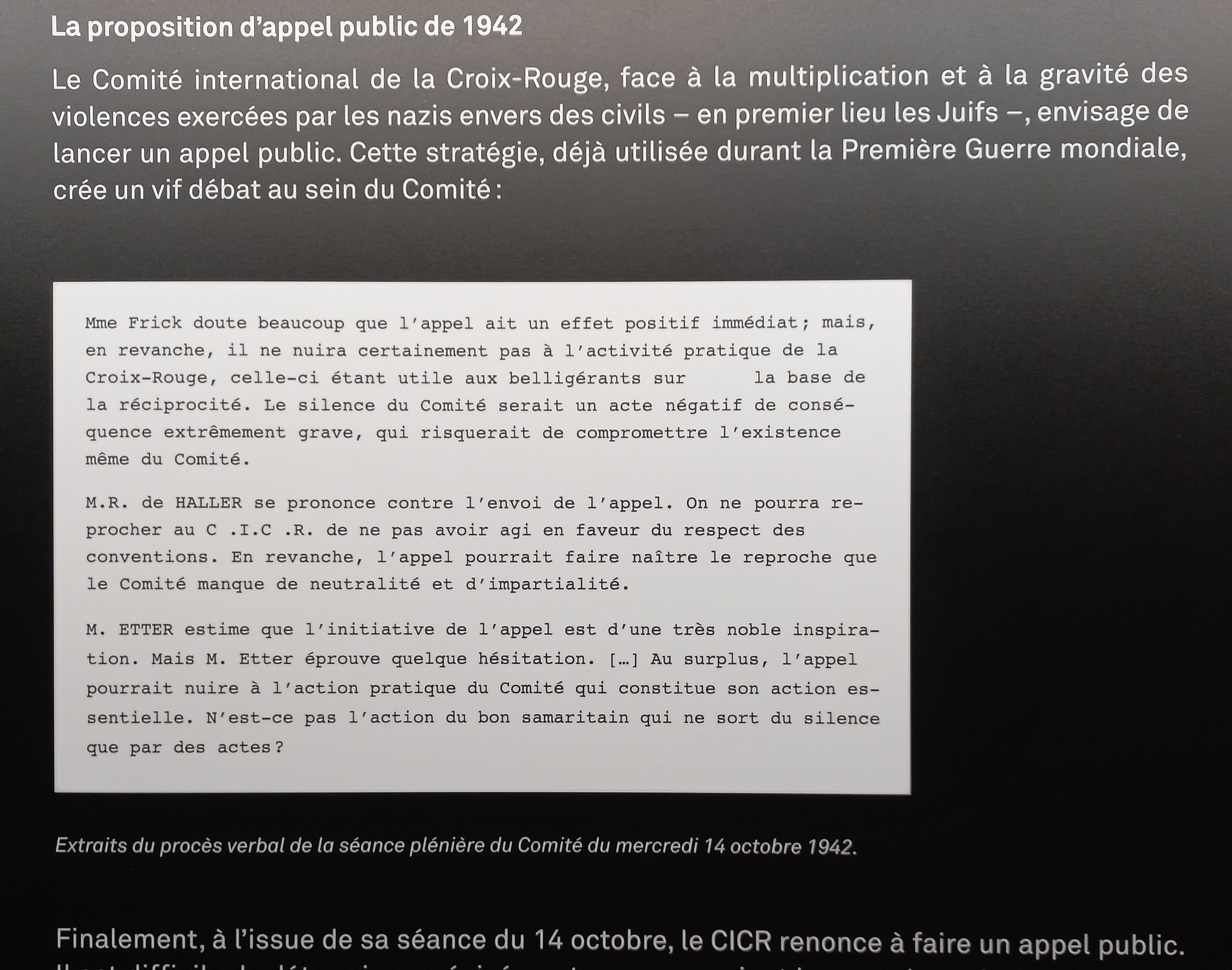
Frick-Cramer's statement from 14 October 1942 at the Museum

While on the committee she tried to convince the ICRC President Max Huber, who at the time was privately involved in the arms industry, and his successor Burckhardt to intervene on behalf of civilians held by Nazi Germany, especially in the concentration camps, but to no avail.

In May 1942, the ICRC revived its working group for POWs and detained civilians with Frick-Cramer holding the dossier for the latter. Yet, the top-leadership did not follow her recommendation to demand from the General Governorate for the Occupied Polish Region the right for deported persons to transmit messages to their families. By autumn of that year, the ICRC leadership – including Frick-Cramer – received reports about the systematic extermination of Jews by Nazi Germany in Eastern Europe, the so-called Final Solution. While a large majority of the ICRC's about two dozen members at its general assembly on 14 October 1942 – especially its female members Frick-Cramer, Ferrière, Odier, and Renée Bordier – was in favour of a public protest, Burckhardt and Switzerland's President Philipp Etter firmly denied that request. Frick-Cramer then urged for a direct intervention. The minutes of the meeting, which are on display at the International Red Cross and Red Crescent Museum in Geneva, recorded her following statement (in French):

«Madam Frick strongly doubts that an appeal would immediately have a positive effect. However, on the other hand, it would certainly not interfere with the practical activity of the Red Cross, which is useful to belligerents on the basis of reciprocity. The silence of the committee would be a negative act with extremely grave consequences, which would risk to compromise the very existence of the committee.»

Yet, this warning was rebuked as well. As a consequence, Frick-Cramer's standing inside the organisation was diminished: when the executive committee established a department for special assistance to civilian detainees, Frick-Cramer as well as her fellow experts Ferrière and Odier were left out of it.

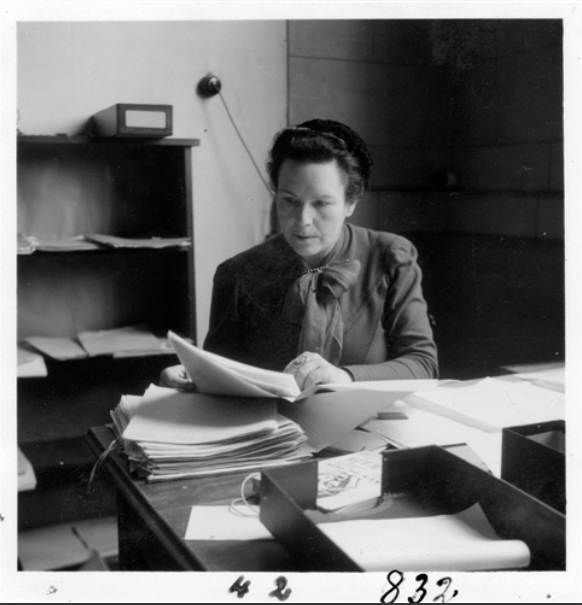
Another portray by Fred Boissonnas, apparently from 1942

In late 1944, the Norwegian Nobel Committee announced that it awarded the ICRC its second Nobel Peace Prize after 1917. As in World War I, it was the only recipient during the war years. While the then leadership of the ICRC was later sharply criticized for not publicly denouncing Nazi Germany's system of extermination and concentration camps, it may be argued that Frick-Cramer all the more made her distinct contribution to what the Norwegian Nobel Committee credited the ICRC with, i.e.

«the great work it has performed during the war on behalf of humanity.»

However, shortly afterwards, in late November 1944, Frick-Cramer was so shocked by reports about Nazi human experiments that she wrote in a private note:

«If nothing can be done, then one should send to those unfortunate ones the means to end their lives; perhaps that would be more humane than to send them food aid.»

=== Post-1945 ===
Frick-Cramer retired from the committee on 3 October 1946. According to Irène Herrmann, professor of the transnational history of Switzerland at the University of Geneva, she pointed in her resignation letter to the failures of the ICRC during the Second World War as well as to the growing competition from other organisations. However,

«An explanation for her decision was not given in the letter which cannout be found in the ICRC archives. Why a woman of her dedication and talent would step down from the committee at such a crucial moment, will forever remain a mystery. We can only make certain assumptions. One possible reason is that she had a burn-out, was tired and looking forward to spend her well-deserved retirement at a familiar place.»

And:

«The irony of the story is this: when the ICRC had to find a strategy to account for its silence over the holocaust and to exonerate itself, it turned of all people to Frick-Cramer. Her loyalty was so strong that she agreed to do it and brought forward the argument that the protection of civilians – for which she had advocated so strongly! – was not part of the ICRC mandate. Was this perhaps one humiliation too much? That is what the events at least indicate to and so her resignation appears in totally different light.»

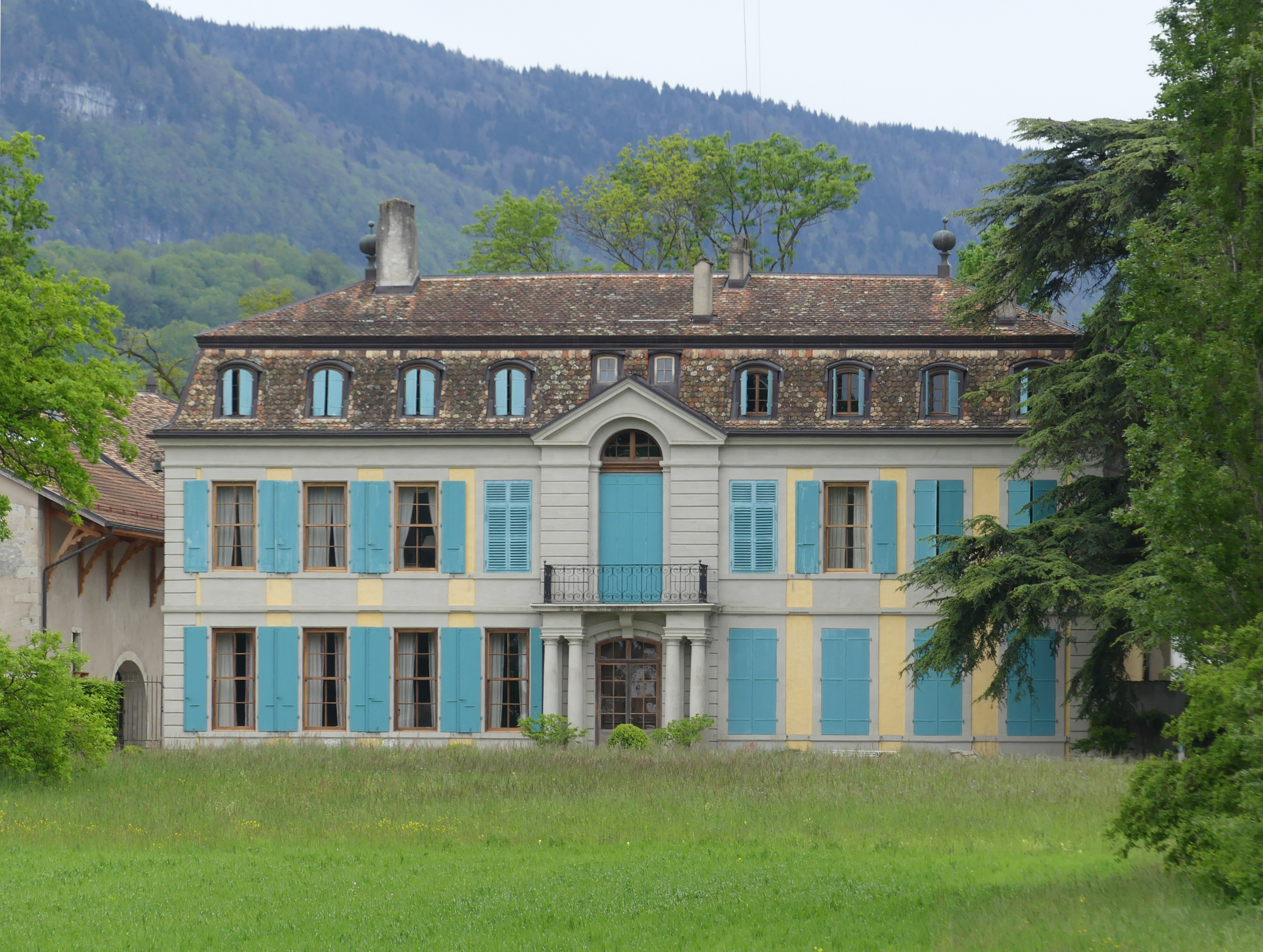
The mansion of the Micheli domain in Landecy

Upon her retirement, Frick-Cramer was once again made an honorary member and kept that title for the rest of her life, which she spent with her husband at her family estate, the Micheli domain of Landecy in Bardonnex. Frick-Cramer continued to promote the idea of the "Tokyo-project" and submitted the text of a draft convention which would have merged the conventions protecting soldiers and civilians. Though it was turned down, the adoption of the 1949 Geneva Conventions was still

«the conclusion of a long process in which she played a crucial role.»

On 10 October 1963, the Norwegian Nobel Committee announced that it awarded the ICRC its third Nobel Peace Prize after 1917 and 1944, making it the only organisation to be honoured thrice. «The small grande dame» – as many called Frick-Cramer with great affection – died twelve days later. The obituary in the International Review of the Red Cross praised her "vast experience" and "grand authority", while stressing that she was on the other hand a "modest" person. She was survived by her husband who died in 1981, her daughter Jacqueline and her three grandchildren.

== Legacy ==
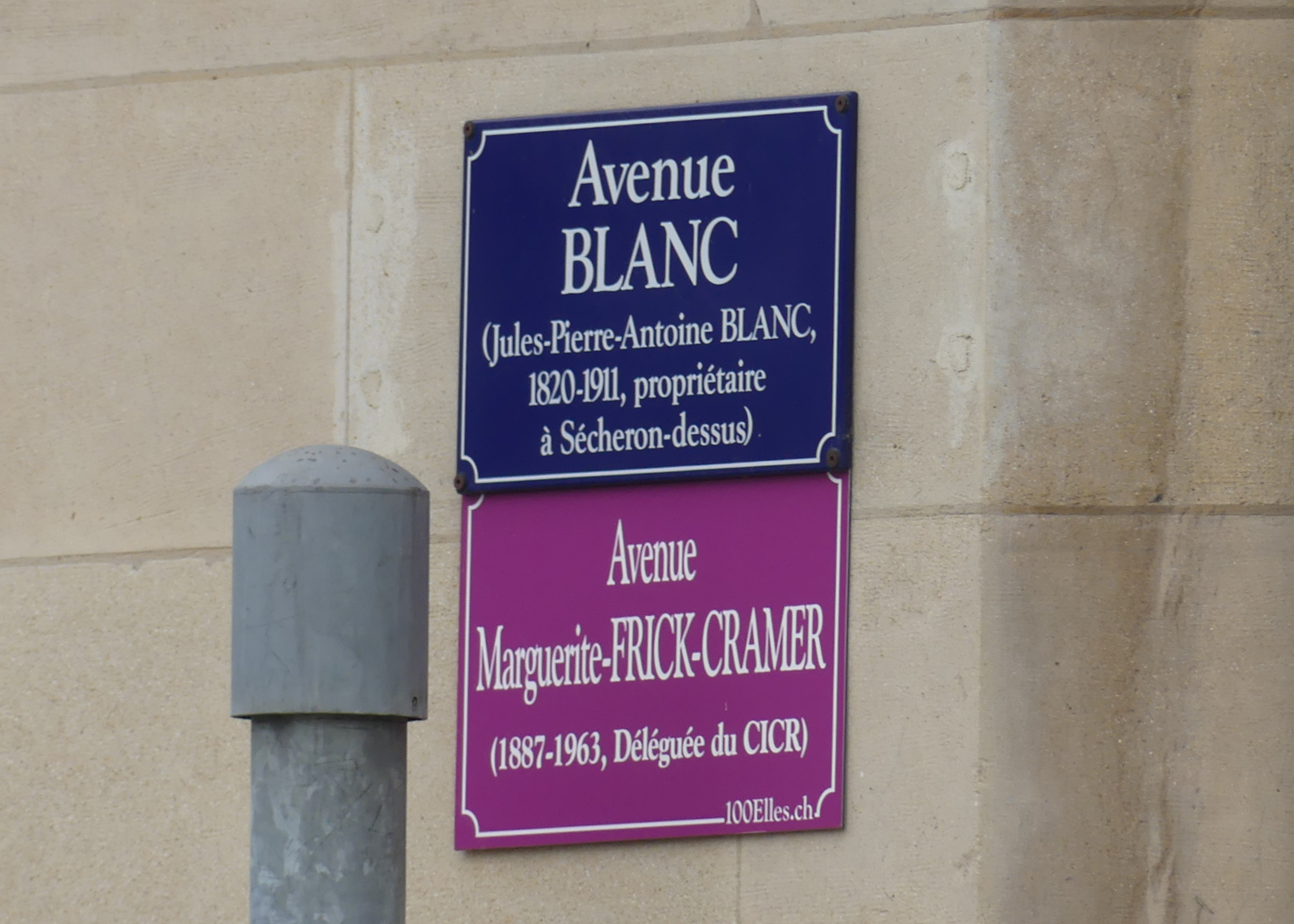
Avenue BLANC / Avenue Marguerite FRICK-CRAMER

From June until September 2009, when the University of Geneva celebrated its 450th anniversary, a larger-than-life portrait of Frick-Cramer was part of the exposition "FACES à FACES" on the facade of the Uni Dufour building, in sight of the Musée Rath where she once started her ICRC career.

In 2019, the project 100elles in Geneva – where 549 streets are named after men and only 43 after women – put up a temporary street sign with Frick-Cramer's name at the Avenue Blanc in the Sécheron quarter of Geneva, where the ICRC and the United Nations Office as well as many permanent missions to the UN are based.

A 2020 portrait by an ICRC librarian stresses that Frick-Cramer left behind

«the memory of a woman confident in the value of the humanitarian ideal, and a tenacious and determined worker who was inventive and innovative in the way she thought about international humanitarian law. She believed that the ICRC's activities were not limited by past Conventions and resolutions, but that it had both "the right and the duty to innovate whenever the laws of humanity require it."»

== Selected works ==
- Dijk, Boyd van, 'Marguerite Frick-Cramer: A Life Spent Shaping the Geneva Conventions', in Immi Tallgren (ed.), Portraits of Women in International Law: New Names and Forgotten Faces? (Oxford, 2023; online edn, Oxford Academic, 18 May 2023), https://doi.org/10.1093/oso/9780198868453.003.0018, accessed 4 Dec. 2024.
- Genève et les Suisses. Histoire des nigociations pniliminaires I l’entrie de Genève dans le Corps helvitique 1641-1792, Geneva 1914
- Rapatriement des prisonniers de guerre centraux en Russie et en Sibérie et des prisonniers de guerre russes en Allemagne, in: Revue internationale de la Croix-Rouge, Vol. 2, no. 17, May 1920, pp. 526–556
- Appel du Dr Nansen en faveur des réfugiés en Asie Mineure et en Grèce, in: Revue internationale de la Croix-Rouge, Vol. 4, no. 48, December 1922, pp. 1108–1109
- A propos des projets de conventions internationales réglant le sort des prisonniers, in: Revue internationale de la Croix-Rouge, No. 74, February 1925, pp. 73–84
- Organisation d'un bureau central de renseignements, Geneva 1932
- Le Comité international de la Croix-Rouge et les Conventions internationales pour les prisonniers de guerre et les civils, in: Revue internationale de la Croix-Rouge, No. 293, May 1943, pp. 386–402
- Au service des familles dispersées, in: Revue internationale de la Croix-Rouge, No. 304, April 1944, pp. 307–317
- Im Dienste der getrennten Familien, Geneva 1944
- Le rapatriement des prisonniers du front oriental, après la guerre de 1914 - 1918 (1919 - 1922), in: Revue internationale de la Croix-Rouge, No. 309, September 1944, pp. 700–727
- Repatriation of prisoners of war from the eastern front after the war of 1914 - 1918 (1919 - 1922), in: Revue internationale de la Croix-Rouge : supplement, No. 309, September 1944
- The International Committee of the Red Cross and the international conventions relative to prisoners of war and civilians, Geneva 1945
