= Pauline Chaponnière-Chaix =

Swiss nurse, feminist and suffragette

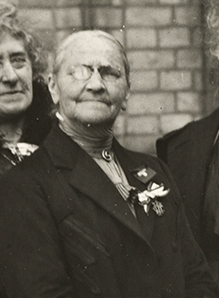
- (ca. 1920)

Signature
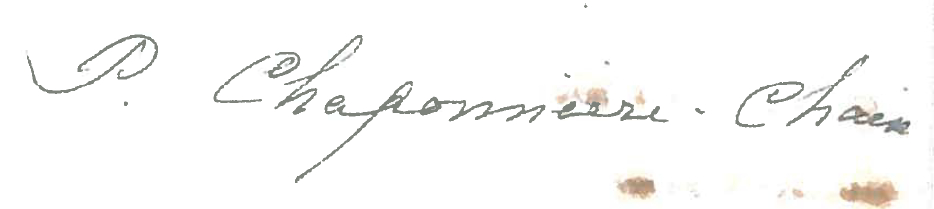

Pauline Chaponnière-Chaix (Geneva, 1 November 1850 – Geneva, 6 December 1934) was a Swiss nurse, feminist and suffragette. She was one of four employees of the International Committee of the Red Cross after World War I, and served as president of the International Council of Women during the period of 1920–22.

== Bibliography ==
- Janz, Oliver; Schönpflug, Daniel (30 April 2014). Gender History in a Transnational Perspective: Networks, Biographies, Gender Orders. Berghahn Books. ISBN 978-1-78238-275-1.
