= Hermann Heller =

Hermann Heller may refer to:

- Hermann Heller (legal scholar) (1891–1933), German legal scholar and philosopher
- Hermann Heller (Swiss politician) (1850–1917)
