= International Short Stories =

International Short Stories Vol. I–III
- Editor: William Patten
- Language: English
- Series: International Short Stories
- Genre: historical fiction, melodrama, philosophical fiction, picaresque, sea story, tragedy, detective fiction, mystery fiction, horror fiction, science fiction, et al.
- Publisher: P.F. Collier & Son
- Publication date: 1910
- Publication place: United States
- Media type: Print
- Pages: 1,146
- OCLC: 1187763
- LC Class: PZ1.P277 I

International Short Stories is a three-volume anthology of outstanding English, American, and French short stories and novellae of the 18th, 19th, and early 20th centuries. It was published by P.F. Collier & Son in 1910. The first volume features celebrated short fiction from the United States, the second volume of England, and the third of France (translated into English). The three-volume series was compiled by Frances J. Reynolds, and edited by William Patten.

== Contents ==
=== Volume I: American ===
1. "The Prophetic Pictures" by Nathaniel Hawthorne
2. "The Legend of Sleepy Hollow" by Washington Irving
3. "The Gold-Bug" by Edgar Allan Poe
4. "Corporal Flint's Murder" by James Fenimore Cooper
5. "Uncle Jim and Uncle Billy" by Bret Harte
6. "The Notary of Perigueux" by Henry Wadsworth Longfellow
7. "The Widow's Cruise" by Frank R. Stockton
8. "The Count and the Wedding Guest" by O. Henry
9. "Miss Tooker's Wedding Gift" by John Kendrick Bangs
10. "The Fable of the Two Mandolin Players and the Willing Performer" by George Ade
11. "The Fable of the Preacher Who Flew His Kite, But Not Because He Wished to Do So" by George Ade
12. "The Shadows on the Wall" by Mary E. Wilkins Freeman
13. "Major Perdue's Bargain" by Joel Chandler Harris
14. "A Kentucky Cinderella" by Francis Hopkinson Smith
15. "By the Waters of Paradise" by Francis Marion Crawford
16. "A Memorable Night" by Anna Katharine Green
17. "The Man from Red Dog" by Alfred Henry Lewis
18. "Jean Michaud's Little Ship" by Charles G.D. Roberts
19. "Those Old Lunes!" by William Gilmore Simms
20. "The Chiropodist" by Bayard Taylor
21. "Mr. Dooley on Corporal Punishment" by Finley Peter Dunne
22. "Over a Wood Fire" by Ik Marvel

=== Volume II: English ===
1. "The Two Drovers" by Sir Walter Scott
2. "Mr. Deuceace" by William Makepeace Thackeray
3. "The Brothers" by Edward Bulwer-Lytton
4. "Doctor Manette's Manuscript" by Charles Dickens
5. "The Caldron of Oil" by Wilkie Collins
6. "The Burial of the Tithe" by Samuel Lover
7. "The Knightsbridge Mystery" by Charles Reade
8. "The Courting of Dinah Shadd" by Rudyard Kipling
9. "The Sire de Maletroit's Door" by Robert Louis Stevenson
10. "The Secret of Goresthorpe Grange" by Arthur Conan Doyle
11. "A Change of Treatment" by W. W. Jacobs
12. "The Stickit Minister" by Samuel Rutherford Crockett
13. "The Lammas Preaching" by Samuel Rutherford Crockett
14. "An Undergraduate's Aunt" by F. Anstey
15. "The Silhouettes" by Arthur Quiller-Couch
16. "My Brother Henry" by J. M. Barrie
17. "Gilray's Flower Pot" by J. M. Barrie
18. "Mr. O'Leary's Second Love" by Charles Lever
19. "The Indifference of the Miller of Hofbau" by Anthony Hope Hawkins
20. "The Stolen Body" by H. G. Wells
21. "The Lazarette of the 'Huntress'" by William Clark Russell
22. "The Great Triangular Duel" by Frederick Marryat
23. "Three Thimbles and a Pea" by George Borrow

=== Volume III: French ===
1. "A Piece of Bread" by François Coppée
2. "The Elixir of Life" by Honoré de Balzac
3. "The Age for Love" by Paul Bourget
4. "Mateo Falcone" by Prosper Mérimée
5. "The Mirror" by Catulle Mendès
6. "My Nephew Joseph" by Ludovic Halévy
7. "A Forest Betrothal" by Erckmann-Chatrian
8. Zadig the Babylonian by Francois Marie Arouet de Voltaire
9. "Abandoned" by Guy de Maupassant
10. "The Guilty Secret" by Charles Paul de Kock
11. "Jean Monette" by Eugène François Vidocq
12. "Solange" by Alexandre Dumas
13. "The Birds in the Letter-box" by René Bazin
14. "Jean Gourdon's Four Days" by Émile Zola
15. "Baron de Trenck" by Antoinette Henriette Clémence Robert
16. "The Passage of the Red Sea" by Henry Murger
17. "The Woman and the Cat" by Marcel Prévost
18. "Gil Blas and Dr. Sangrado" by Alain-René Lesage
19. "A Fight with a Cannon" by Victor Hugo
20. "Tonton" by Adolphe Chenevière
21. "The Last Lesson" by Alphonse Daudet
22. "Croisilles" by Alfred de Musset
23. "The Vase of Clay" by Jean Aicard

== See also ==
- 18th-century French literature
- 19th-century French literature
- 20th-century French literature
- American literature
- British literature
