= Rudolf Geilinger =

Swiss politician

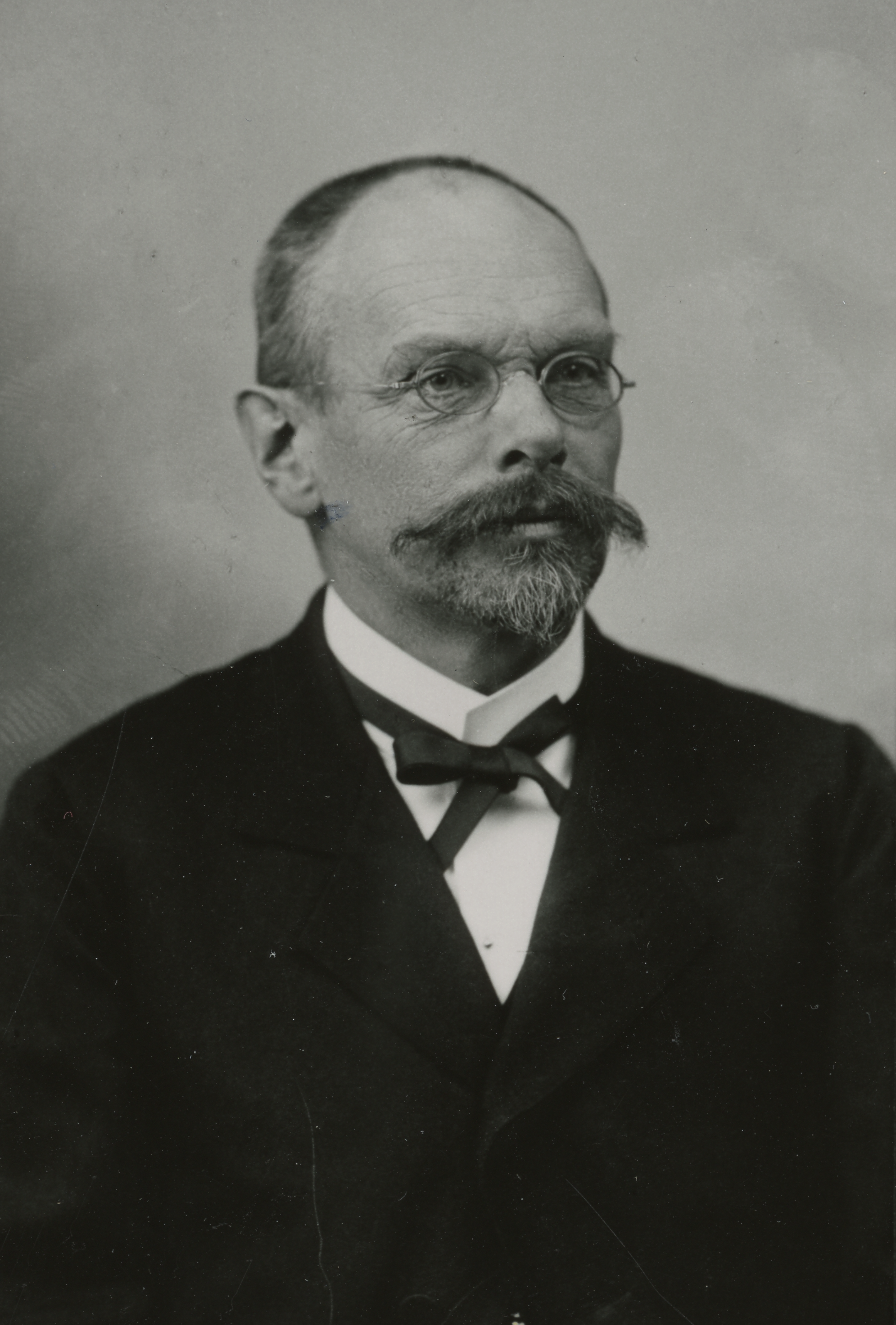
Rudolf Geilinger (1895)

Rudolf Geilinger (6 May 1848 – 23 January 1911) was a Swiss politician, mayor of Winterthur (1879–1911) and President of the Swiss National Council (1899/1900).

Preceded by Hermann Heller	President of the National Council; 1899/1900	Succeeded by Fritz Bühlmann
