= Fritz Bühlmann =

Swiss politician

Fritz Ernst Bühlmann (22 March 1848, Grosshöchstetten – 7 January 1936) was a Swiss politician and President of the Swiss National Council (1900/1901).

== Works ==
- Bühlmann, Fritz Ernst (1912). Das schweizerische Zivilgesetzbuch im Kanton Bern: Ein Handbuch zur Orientierung in neuen Recht (in German). Bern: Stämplfi.

Preceded by Rudolf Geilinger	President of the National Council; 1900/1901	Succeeded by Gustave Ador
