= Adolphe Chenevière =

Swiss writer and literary scholar (1855–1917)

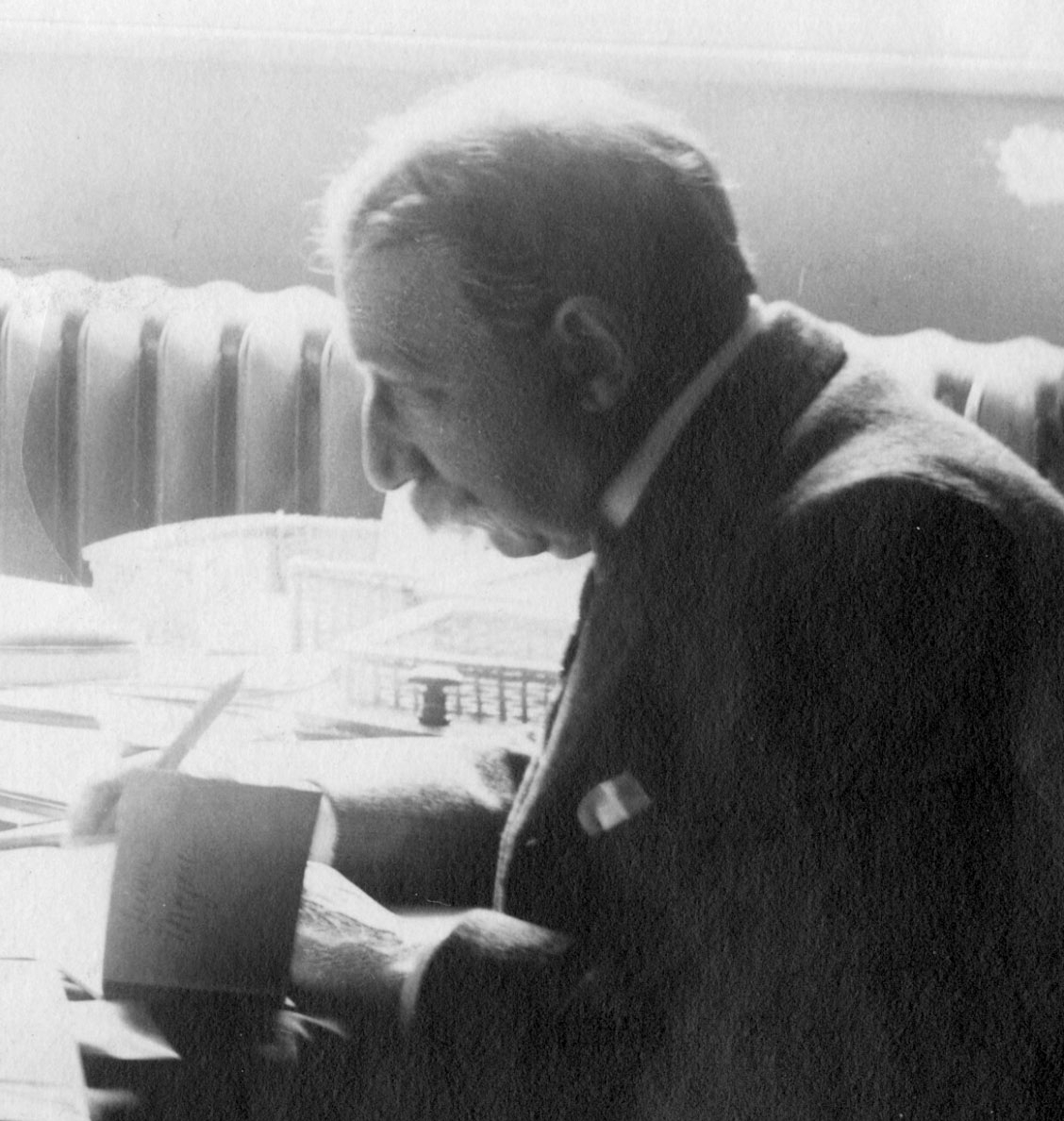
- at the IPWA around 1915
- Born: 30 January 1855
- Died: 1917 (age 62)
- Education: Doctorat ès lettres
- Alma mater: University of Paris
- Occupation: Novelist
- Spouse: Blanche Ernestine Augustine Lugol (1865–1911)
- Children: Jacques Chenevière (1886–1976); André Alfred Chenevière (1888–1888)
- Writing career
- Language: French, Latin
- Genre: historical romance et al.
- Subject: literary criticism

Adolphe Chenevière, D.ès.L. (1855–1917) was a fin de siècle Swiss novelist, short story writer, and literary scholar.

== Life ==
Adolphe Chenevière was born to Arthur Chenevière (a state counsellor for the canton of Geneva) and Susanne Firmine (née Munier). He earned a doctorate from the University of Paris; his thesis, Bonaventure Des Périers, sa vie, sa poésie, examined the life and poetic works of the 16th-century author Bonaventure des Périers. E. Plon published the thesis in 1885. Having completed his studies, Chenevière married Blanche Ernestine Augustine Lugol.

In 1886, Plon published De Plutarchi Familiaribus, Chenevière's Latin dissertation on Plutarch. Meanwhile, Chenevière and his wife had their first son, Jacques Chenevière, who was born in Paris. In 1888, their second son, André Alfred, was born, but he did not survive infancy; Chenevière's mother, too, died that year.

From the late 1880s through the end of the century, he wrote a steady series of novels, including various romances published by Alphonse Lemerre. One of his stories, "Tonton", was translated into English and included in the third volume of the International Short Stories series published by P.F. Collier & Son in 1910.

During the First World War, Chenevière volunteered at the International Prisoners-of-War Agency (IPWA) of the International Committee of the Red Cross (ICRC) like his son Jacques, who went on to become both a celebrated writer and a high-ranking member of the ICRC himself.

Stratford Magazine republished this translation in their September 1927 issue, ten years after Chenevière's death.

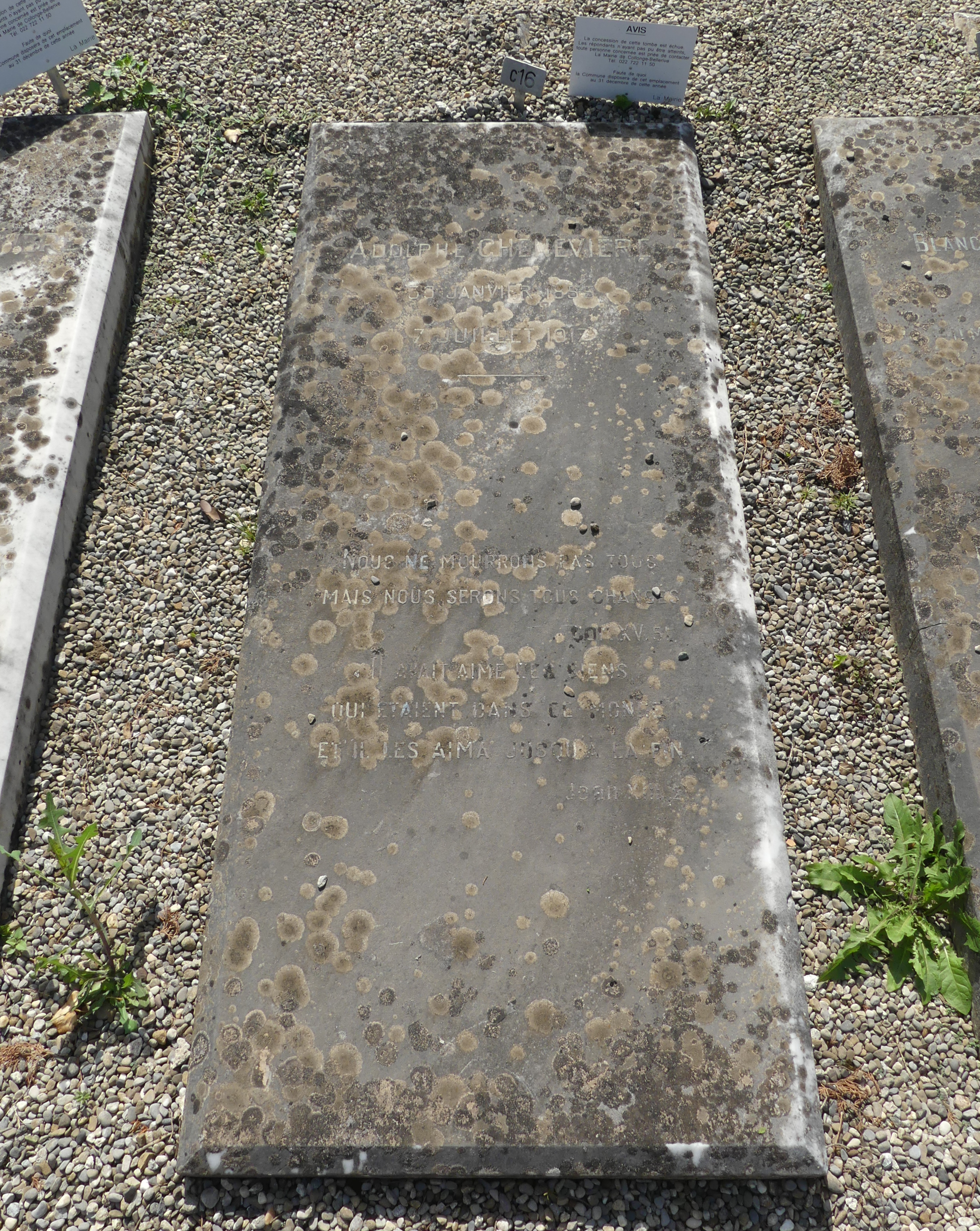
Chenevière's grave

== Novels ==
- Secret amour (1889),
- Contes d'amour (1890)
- Jacques l'intrépide (1890)
- Double faute (1891)
- Henri Vernol, aimer ou croire? (1892)
- Honneur de femme (1893)
- Perle fausse (1894)
- Quatre femmes (1895)
- L'Indulgente (1897)
- Le Roman d'un inquiet (1900)
- Idylle Rouge (1901)
