= Ulrich Meister =

Swiss politician

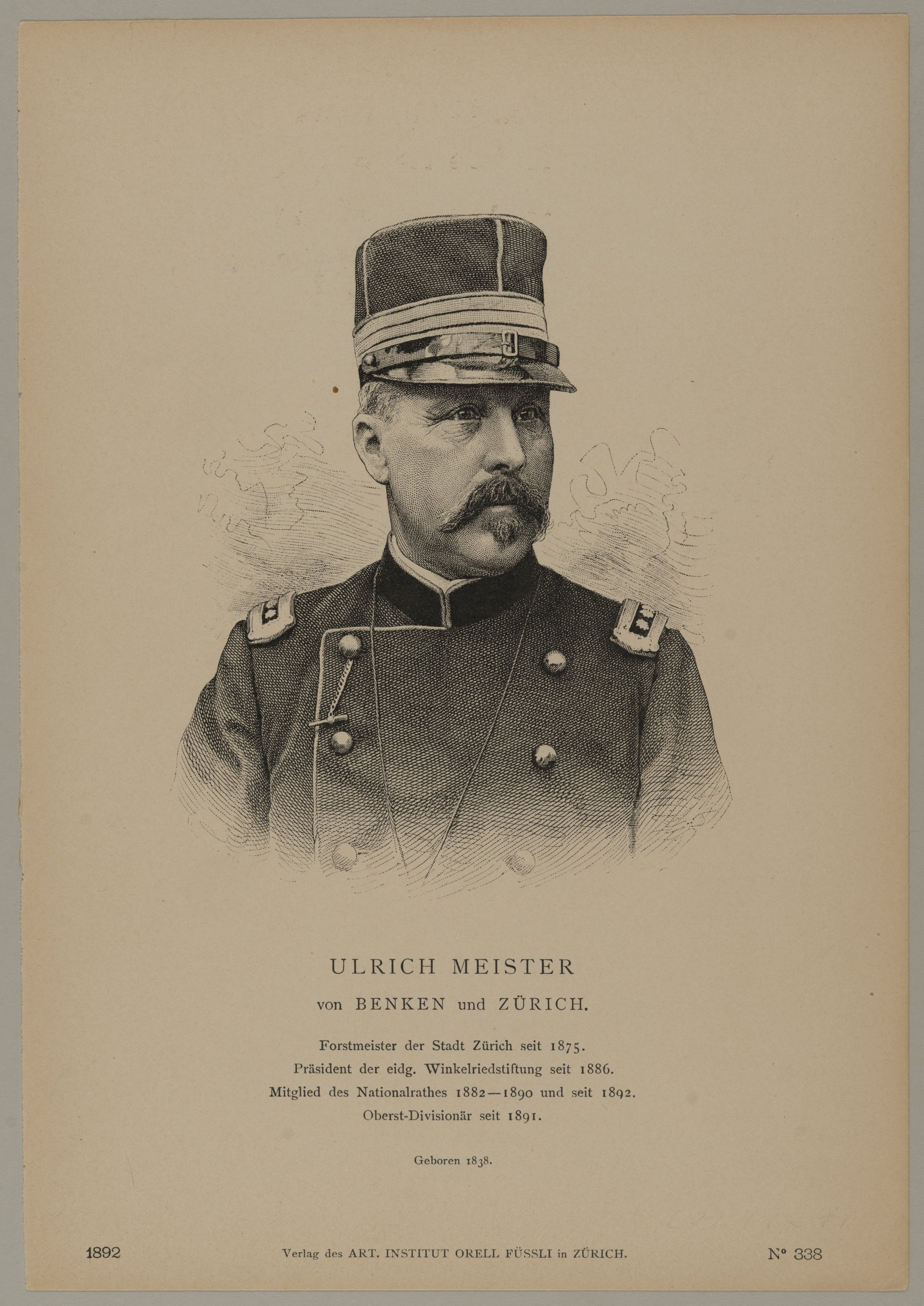
Ulrich Meister (1892)

Ulrich Meister (4 January 1838 – 3 February 1917) was a Swiss politician who served as the president of the National Council of Switzerland in 1902.

Preceded by Gustave Ador	President of the National Council; 1902	Succeeded by Clemens Iten
