= Bonaventure des Périers =

French writer

Bonaventure des Périers (c. 1500 – 1544) was a French writer.

== Biography ==
He was born of a noble family at Arnay-le-duc in Burgundy at the end of the fifteenth century.

The circumstances of his education are sketchy, but it is known that he was attached to various noble houses in the capacity of tutor. In 1533 or 1534 Des Périers visited Lyon, then the most enlightened town of France, and a refuge for many liberal scholars who might elsewhere have had to suffer for their opinions. He gave some assistance to Robert Olivetan and Lefèvre d'Etaples in the preparation of the vernacular version of the Old Testament, and to Etienne Dolet in the Commentarii linguae latinae.

In 1536 he put himself under the protection of Marguerite de Navarre, queen of Navarre, who made him her valet de chambre. He acted as the queen's secretary, and transcribed the Heptaméron for her. It is probable that his duties extended beyond those of a mere copyist, and some writers have gone so far as to say that the Heptaméron was his work.

The free discussions permitted at Marguerite's court encouraged a licence of thought as displeasing to the Calvinists as to the Catholics. This free inquiry became scepticism in Bonaventure's Cymbalum Mundi ... (1537) and the queen of Navarre thought it prudent to disavow the author, though she continued to help him privately until 1541. The book consisted of four dialogues in imitation of Lucian. Its allegorical form did not conceal its real meaning, and it was likely printed by Morin in early 1538. In March of that year, King Francis I asked that the book be examined and the Sorbonne confirmed the suppression of the edition in July 1538.

The dedication provides a key to the author's intention: Thomas du Clevier (or Clenier) a son ami Pierre Tryocan was recognized by 19th century editors to be an anagram for Thomas l'Incrédule a son ami Pierre Croyant (Thomas the Incredulous to Peter the Believer). It is considered by some scholars to be the first atheist book in French literature, though its highly enigmatic nature has led to many other interpretations. The book was reprinted in Lyon in 1538, which made many bitter enemies for the author. Henri Estienne called it detestable, and Étienne Pasquier said it deserved to be thrown into the fire with its author if he were still living.

Des Périers prudently left Paris, and after some time settled at Lyon where he lived in poverty, until he reportedly (though this is dubious) committing suicide in 1544 by falling on his sword. In 1544 his collected works were printed at Lyon. The volume, Recueil des Œuvres de feu Bonaventure des Périers, included his poems, which are of small merit, the Traité des quatre venus cardinales après Sénèque, and a translation of the Lysis of Plato.

In 1558 the collection of stories and fables entitled the Nouvelles récréations et joyeux devis was released in Lyon. It is on this work that the claim put forward for Des Périers as one of the early masters of French prose rests. Some of the tales are attributed to the editors, Nicholas Denisot and Jacques Peletier, but their share is certainly limited to the later ones. The book leaves something to be desired on the score of morality, but the stories never lack point and are models of simple, direct narration in the vigorous and picturesque French of the 16th century.

== Sources ==
- This further references:
  - The preface to the Cymbalum Mundi ... (ed. F. Franck, 1874)
  - A. Chenevière, Bonaventure Despériers, sa vie, ses poésies (1885)
  - P. Toldo, Contributo allo studio della novella francese del XV. e XVI. secolo (Rome, 1895).

== Bibliography ==
- Gabriella Moretti, "Lettere dagli Antipodi: comunicazioni epistolari fantastiche fra Tiberiano e il Cymbalum mundi," in Sergio Audano, Giovanni Cipriani (ed.), Aspetti della Fortuna dell'Antico nella Cultura Europea: atti della settima giornata di studi, Sestri Levante, 19 marzo 2010 (Foggia: Edizioni il Castello, 2011) (Echo, 1), 77–97.
