= List of mayors of Winterthur =

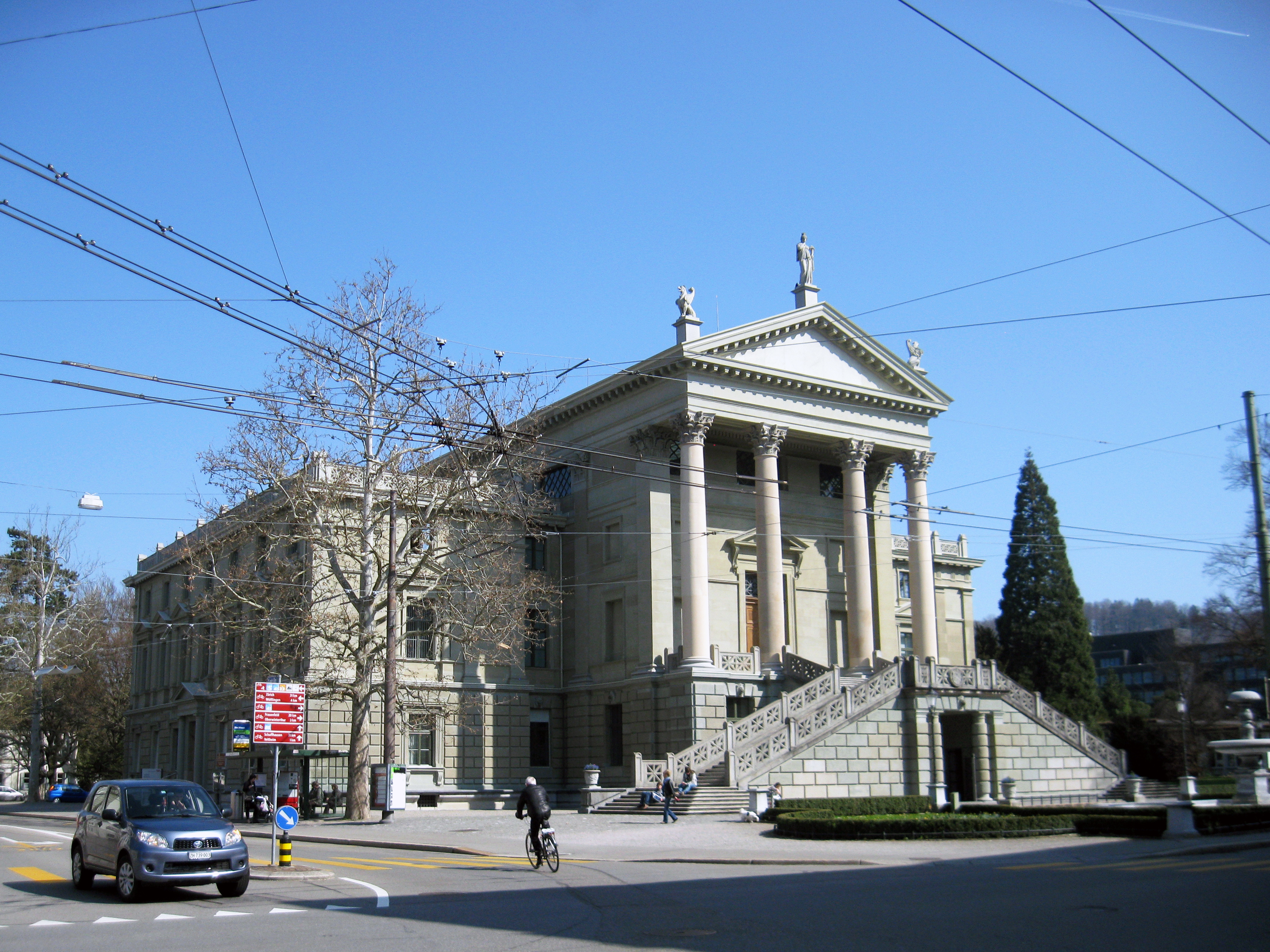
Stadthaus Winterthur

Coat of arms of Winterthur

This is a list of mayors of Winterthur, Canton of Zürich, Switzerland. The mayor of Winterthur (Stadtpräsident von Winterthur) presides over the city council (Stadtrat).

Mayor of Winterthur
Term	Mayor	Lifespan	Party	Notes
1805–1821	Johann Heinrich Steiner	(1747–1827)		
1824–1851	Anton Künzli	(1771–1852)		
1858–1873	Johann Jakob Sulzer	(1821–1897)	DP	
1879–1911	Rudolf Geilinger	(1848–1911)	DP	
1911–1930	Hans Sträuli	(1862–1938)	DP	
1930–1939	Hans Widmer (mayor)	(1889–1939)	DP	
1939–1966	Hans Rüegg	(1902–1972)	DP	
1966–1990	Urs Widmer (mayor)	(1927–2018)	DP	
1990–2002	Martin Haas	(born 1935)	FDP/PRD	
2002–2012	Ernst Wohlwend	(born 1947)	SPS/PSS	
2012-present	Michael Künzle	(born 1965)	'the middle' / CVP	
