= Antoinette Henriette Clémence Robert =

French writer (1797–1872)

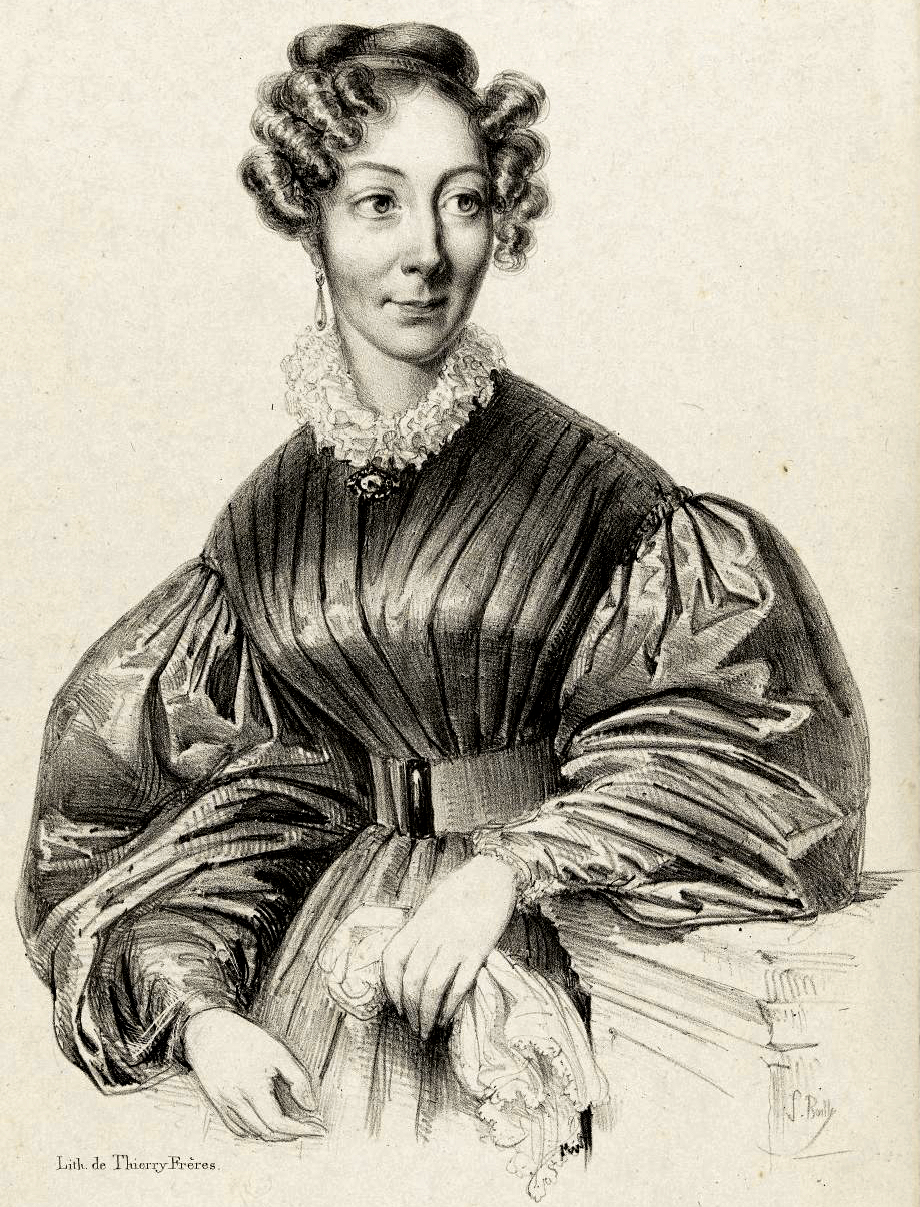
- Born: 6 December 1797; Mâcon, France
- Died: 1 December 1872 (aged 74); Paris, France
- Relatives: Henri Robert (brother)
- Writing career
- Pen name: Clémence Robert
- Language: French
- Genres: historical fiction, military fiction
- Subjects: biography, history
- Literary movement: Romanticism

Antoinette Henriette Clémence Robert (6 December 1797 – 1 December 1872) was a French writer of historical fiction, poetry, non-fiction, stage plays, and short stories. From 1855 to 1870, she and Virginie Ancelot were the most popular novelists of the roman populaire genre. She published much of her work as Clémence Robert.

== Biography ==
Mlle Robert was born in Mâcon in December 1797. She was a strong student with a penchant for history. Her first published work was Cri de joie d’une Française sur la naissance de SAR Mgr le duc de Bordeaux (Mme Ve Porthmann 1820). Her father was a deputy judge in Mâcon. When he died in 1830, the year of the July Revolution, she moved to Paris for the society of other women writers, and to reunite with her older brother (esteemed clockmaker Henri Robert). In her early days in Paris, she worked in a library. In 1845 she retired to the quiet of Abbaye-aux-Bois, a Catholic convent that also let rooms to women of high social standing; soon, however, she returned to her career. Her stay there coincided with a major literary salon hosted by her friends François-René de Chateaubriand and Juliette Récamier, in Mlle Récamier's quarters at the abbey. Clémence Robert died in Paris in 1872, five days before her 75th birthday.

While contemporary novelists drifted toward escapist fiction, her historical novels revisited themes of socialism and républicanisme. Her views were shaped in part by the work of anti-Catholic socialist Eugène Sue (1804–1857).

With Camille Leynadier, she compiled and edited the memoirs of Giuseppe Garibaldi, which they presented as a biography, dramatised in parts. Her most famous short story was "Baron de Trenck", which relates an adventure of the Prussian officer Friedrich von der Trenck, and was inspired by his widely published autobiography.

== Selected works ==
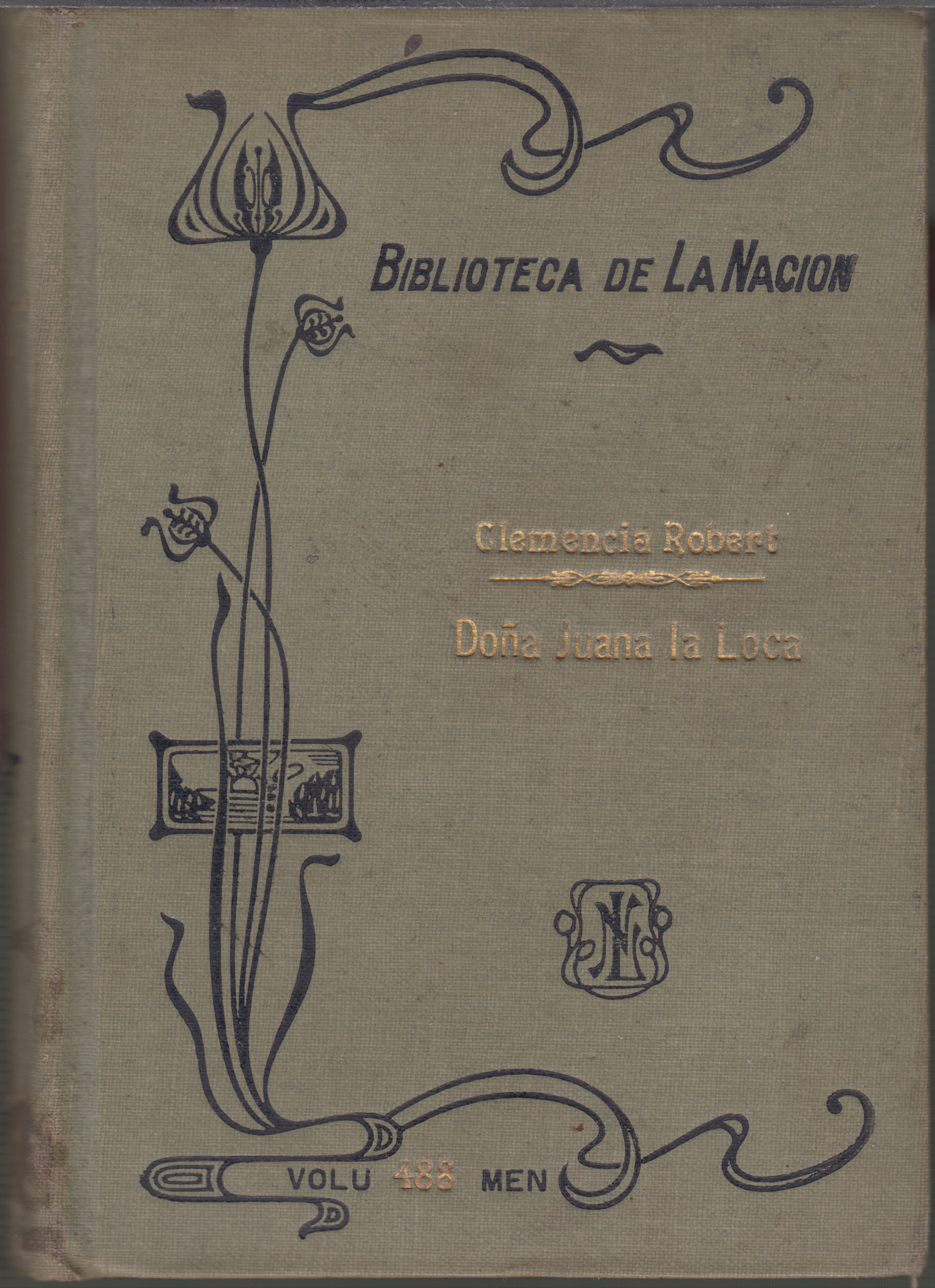
1912 Argentinian edition of Joanna the Mad by Clémence Robert.

- Le Marquis de Pombal. Brussels. 1844. An historical novel concerning Sebastião José de Carvalho e Melo, 1st Marquess of Pombal
- William Shakespeare (in French). Paris: G. Roux et O. Cassanet. 1844. Another French edition was published in Brussels, in 1844, and a German edition was published in Leipzig. A Spanish translation by "F" appeared in Malaga in 1845.
- Les quatre sergents de La Rochelle [The Four Sergeants of La Rochelle]. Paris. 1849.
- Le Mont Saint-Michel, roman historique. 1856. (Year of publication is approximate.)
- Le poëte de la reine [The Queen's Poet]. Paris: Arnauld de Vresse. 1861.. This is a version of her earlier novel William Shakespeare.
- Mémoires authentiques sur Garibaldi. Paris: Fayard. 1860.
- Les victimes du fanatisme [Victims of Fanaticism]. Paris: Arnauld de Vresse. 1864.
- Paris Silhouettes. Paris: Louis Janet.

== See also ==
- International Short Stories (1910)
- Roman populaire (in French)
