= Clemens Iten =

Swiss politician

Clemens Iten (24 February 1858 in Unterägeri – 16 January 1932) was a Swiss politician and President of the Swiss National Council (1902).

== Works ==
- Iten, Clemens (1881). Die Wirkungen des Verzugs des Schuldners beim Fixgeschäft nach deutschem Handelsrecht (in German). Zürich: O. Füssli & Company.

Preceded by Ulrich Meister	President of the National Council; 1902	Succeeded by Konrad Zschokke
