= Gustave Ador =

Swiss politician (1845–1928)

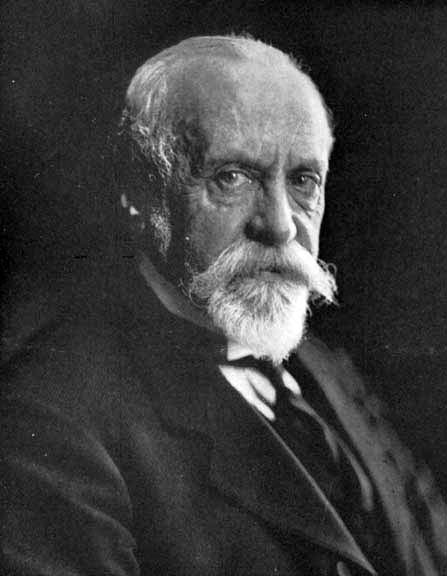

President of Switzerland
- In office 1 January 1919 – 31 December 1919
- Preceded by: Felix Calonder
- Succeeded by: Giuseppe Motta

Swiss Federal Councillor
- In office 26 June 1917 – 31 December 1919
- Department: Political (1917); Home Affairs (1918–1919)
- Preceded by: Arthur Hoffmann
- Succeeded by: Jean-Marie Musy

President of the National Council
- In office 1901–1902
- Preceded by: Fritz Bühlmann
- Succeeded by: Ulrich Meister

Personal details
- Born: 23 December 1845 Cologny, Geneva, Switzerland
- Died: 31 March 1928 (aged 82) Geneva, Geneva, Switzerland
- Party: Liberal
- Education: Academy of Geneva

Gustave Ador (23 December 1845 – 31 March 1928) was a Swiss politician who was President of the Confederation in 1919.

== Biography ==
=== Origins ===
Ador was born in Cologny, a municipality of Geneva. He was the grandson of Jean Pierre Ador, an immigrant from Vaud, who obtained his Genevan citizenship in 1814. Ador studied law at the Academy of Geneva (now a university), and in 1868 became a lawyer.

=== Early political career ===
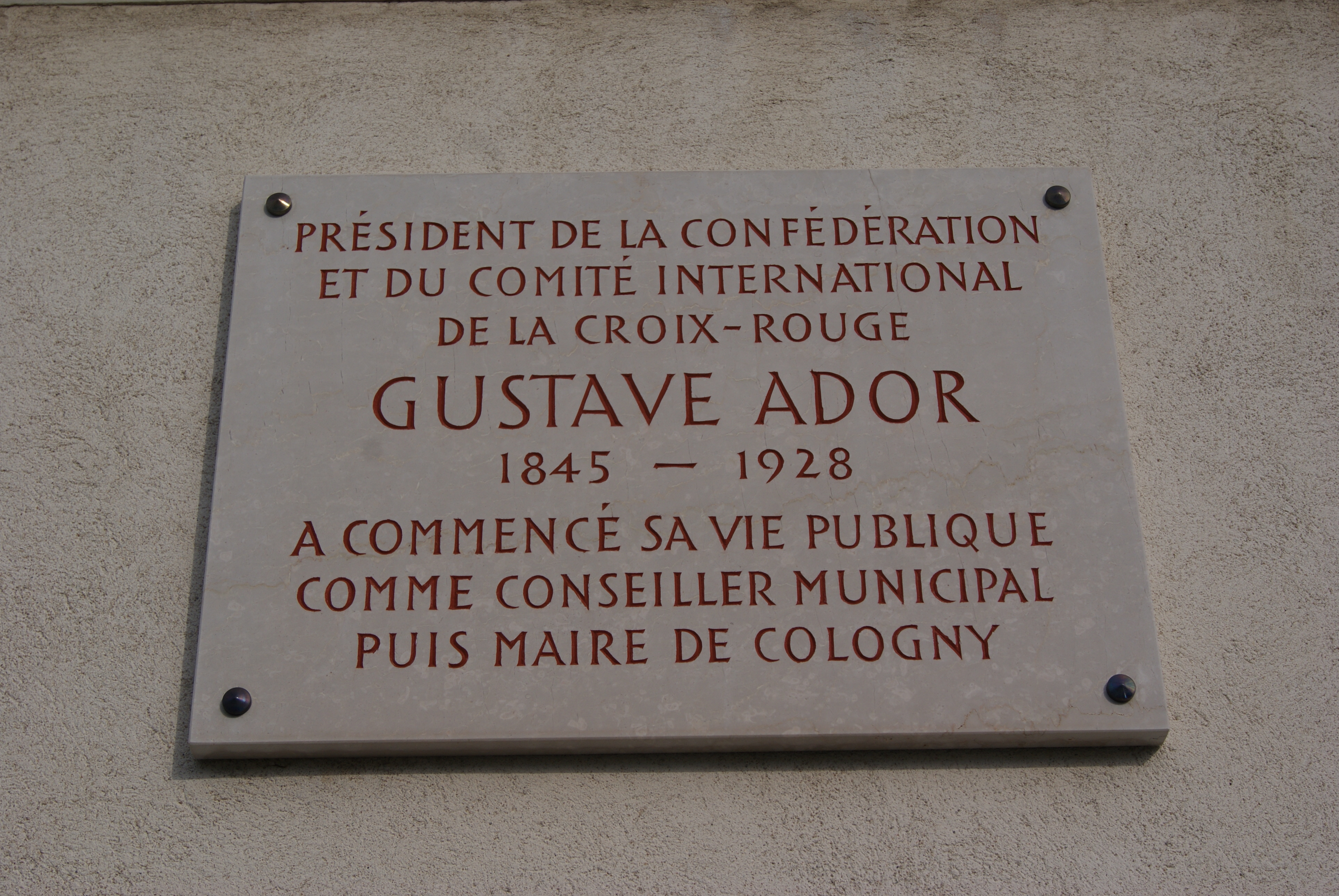
A plaque at Le Manoir in Cologny, Geneva, commemorating the fact that Ador began his public life as a municipal councillor and mayor of Cologny

In 1871, Ador started his political career as a member of the communal council of Cologny, and was twice mayor, in 1878-9 and 1883-5. He was a member of the cantonal parliament 1874-6, and continuously from 1878 to 1915 save for a short break in 1902. In 1878-9 he represented Geneva in the Swiss Council of States. Then he became a member of the executive of the canton of Geneva, being put in charge of the Department of Justice and Police. He resigned after an unfavourable election in 1880, but once more became a member of the cantonal executive in 1885, and for 12 years had charge of the cantonal finances.

=== National Council ===
In 1889, he became a member of the Swiss National Council, and remained so until 1917, being elected President of the Swiss National Council in 1901. He was president of the cantonal executive in 1890, 1892, and 1896. In 1894, he became lieutenant-colonel in the Swiss Army.

Ador served as the president of the International Committee of the Red Cross from 1910 to 1928. In 1914, he founded in Geneva the association for facilitating communications between prisoners of war and the central Geneva agency, and succeeded in giving this enterprise great importance and a widespread extension.

=== Federal Council ===
After the enforced resignation of Arthur Hoffmann, Ador, in order to soothe the Entente, became a federal councillor (a member of the Federal Executive) on 26 June 1917. He was entrusted with the Department of Foreign Affairs. Towards the end of 1918, he was elected by Parliament to be the Swiss President for 1919, but retired from the Federal Executive at the end of his year of office, on 31 December 1919.

During his time as councilor, along with being in the Department of Foreign Affairs (1917), he was later in the Department of Home Affairs (1918–1919). He was affiliated with the Liberal Party.

=== Brussels conference ===
In 1920, Ador chaired the Brussels International Financial Conference.

Political offices
Preceded by Fritz Bühlmann	President of the National Council; 1901/1902	Succeeded by Ulrich Meister
Preceded by Arthur Hoffmann	Member of the Swiss Federal Council; 1917–1919	Succeeded by Jean-Marie Musy
