= Hermann Heller (Swiss politician) =

Swiss politician (1850–1917)

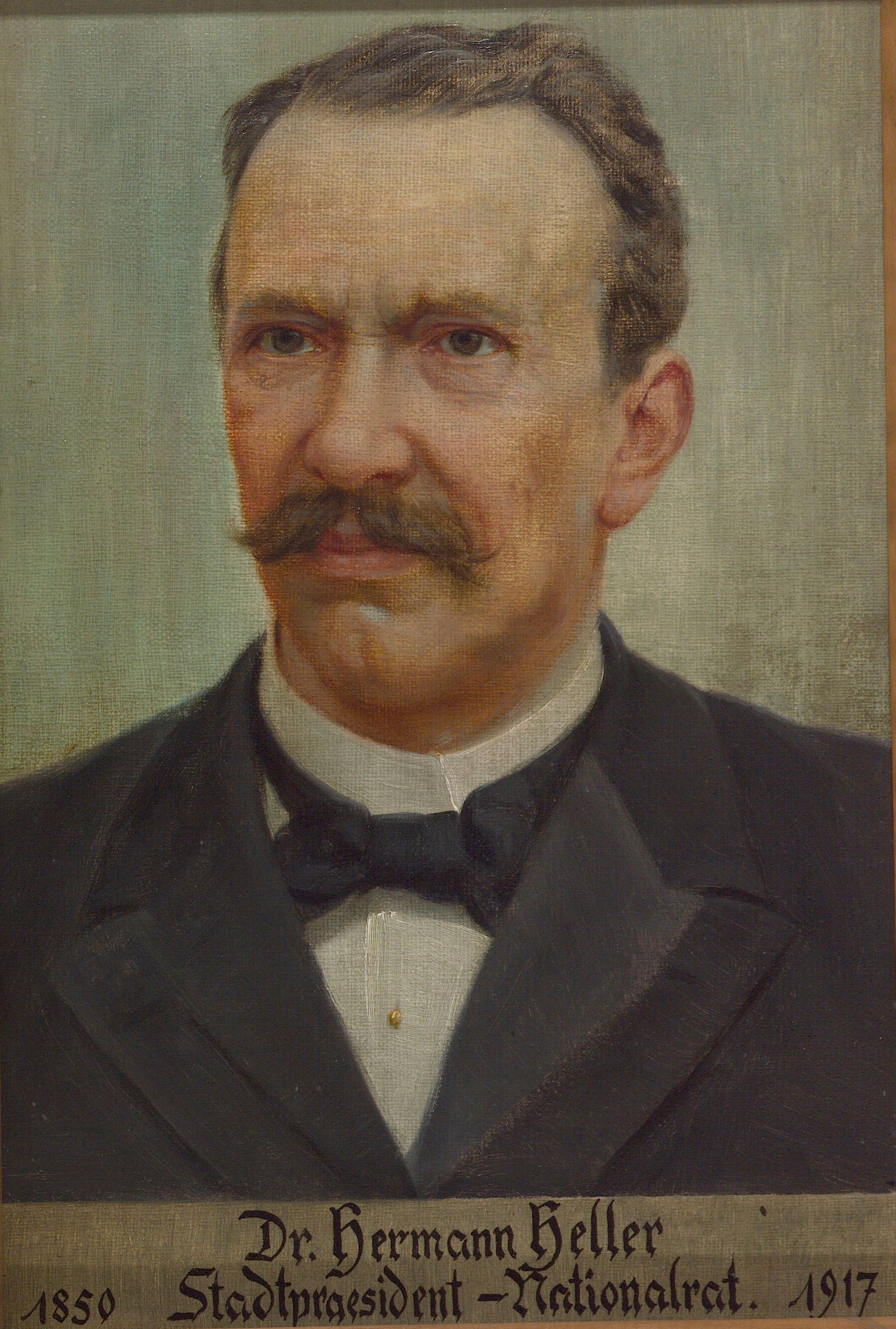
Portrait of Hermann Heller

Hermann Heller (28 January 1850, in Lucerne – 25 June 1917) was a Swiss politician, mayor of Lucerne, member of the Swiss National Council (1891–1917) and its president in 1899 (June–December).

Preceded by Adrien Thélin	President of the National Council; 1899	Succeeded by Rudolf Geilinger
