= Max van Berchem =

Swiss philologist, epigraphist and historian (1863–1921)

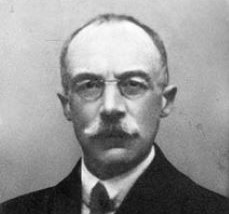
- Photo taken around 1913
- Born: 16 March 1863; Geneva
- Died: 7 March 1921 (aged 57); Vaumarcus

Signature
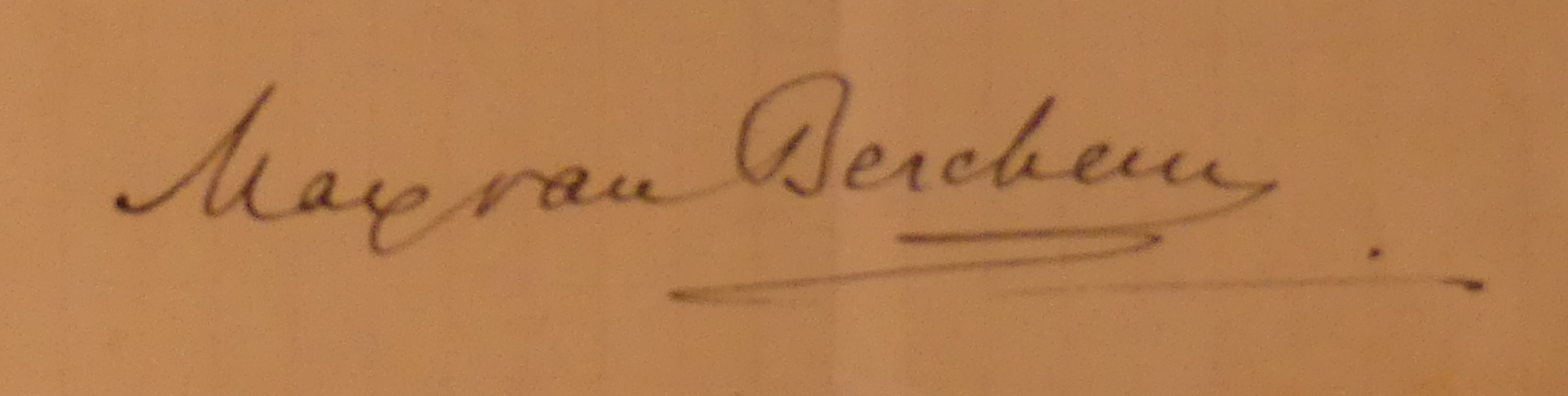

Edmond Maximilien Berthout van Berchem (16 March 1863, Geneva – 7 March 1921, Vaumarcus) commonly known as Max van Berchem, was a Swiss philologist, epigraphist and historian. Best known as the founder of Arabic epigraphy in the Western world, he was the mastermind of the Corpus Inscriptionum Arabicarum, an international collaboration among eminent scholars to collect and publish Arabic inscriptions from the Middle East.

== Life ==
=== Family background ===
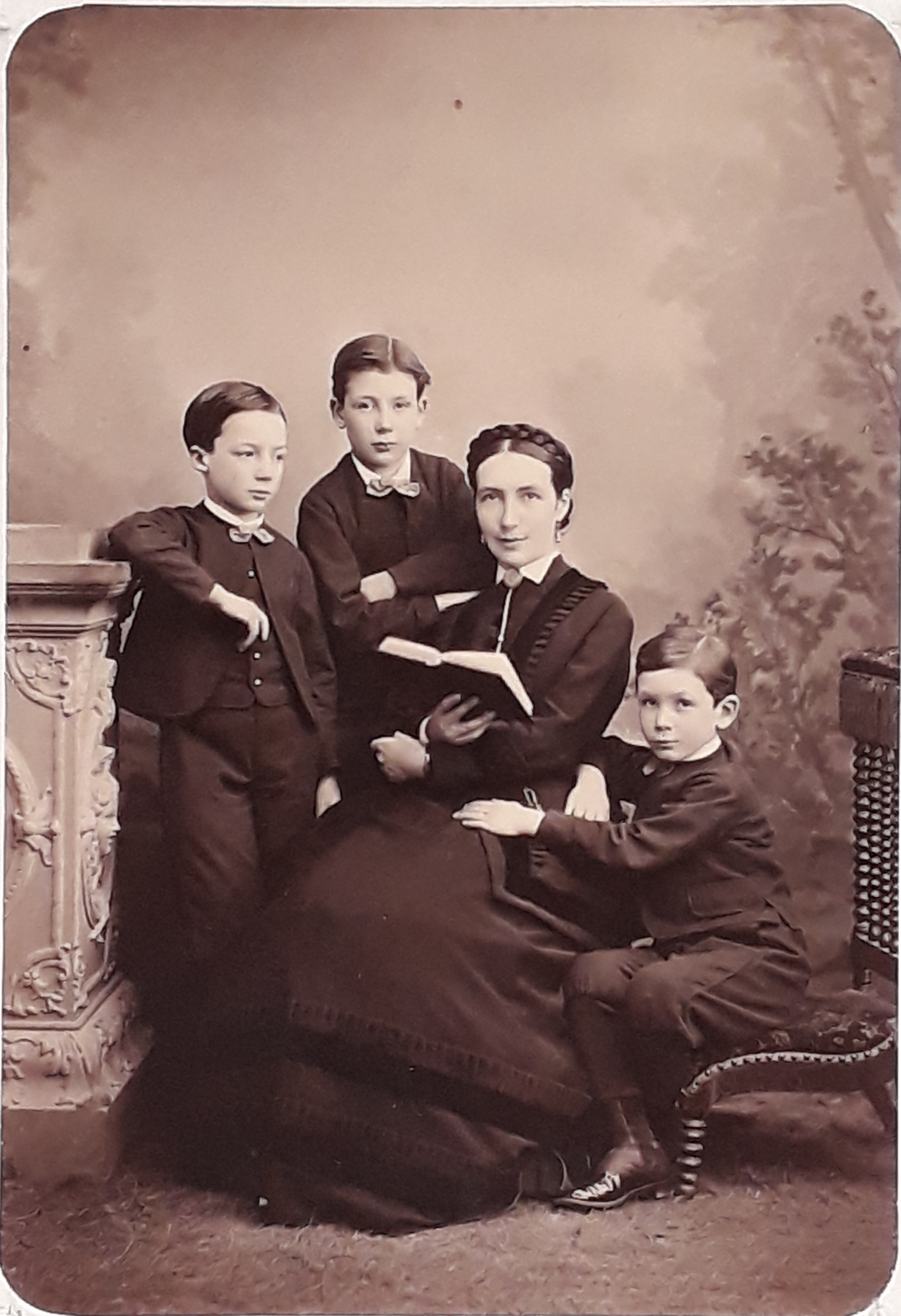
Max, Paul and Victor (from left) and their mother around 1872

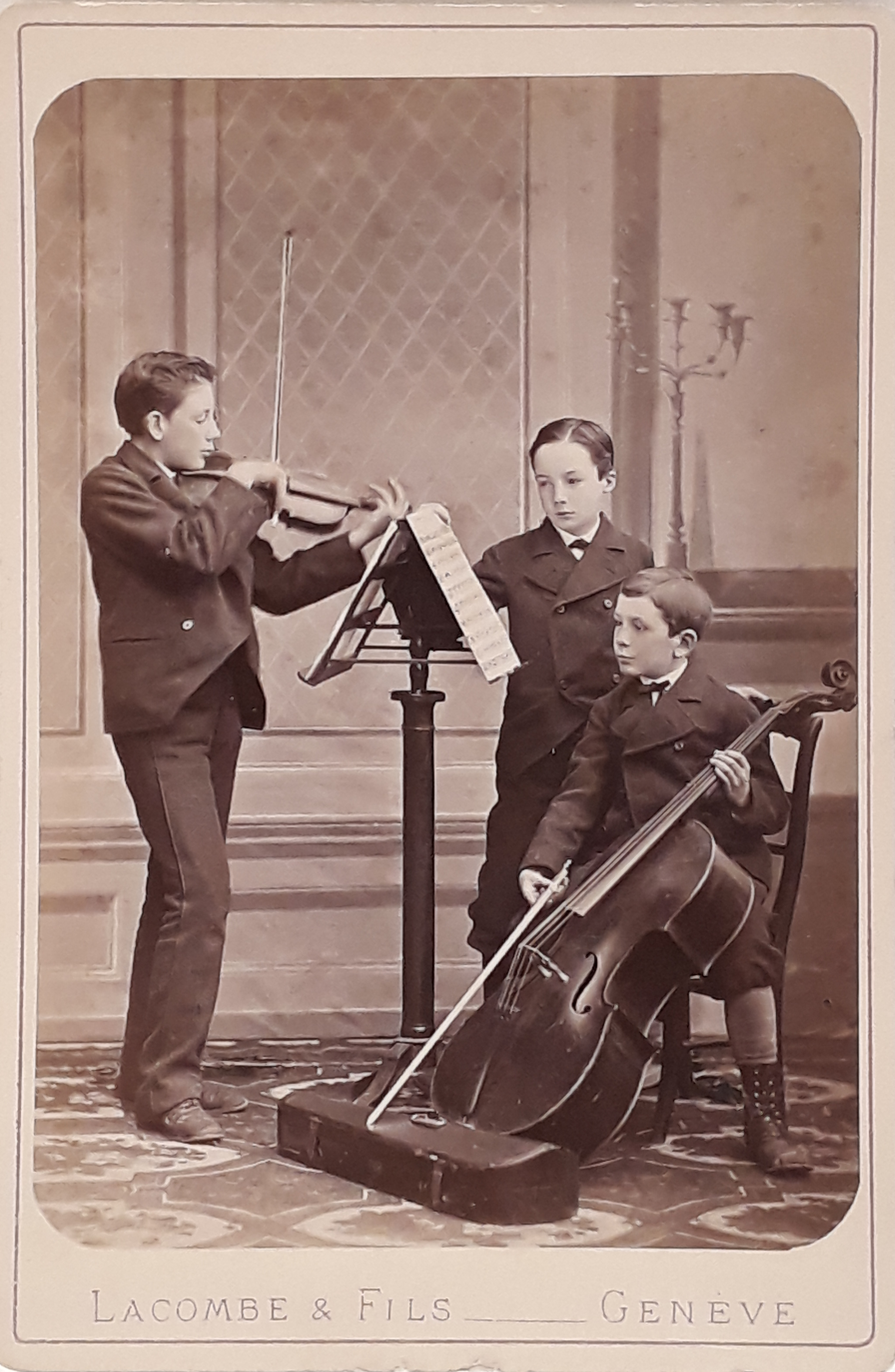
Paul, Max, and Victor (from left) around 1872

Berchem originated from a dynasty of Flemish aristocrats in the former Duchy of Brabant whose roots are traced back to the 11th century. The only branch which survived until today is the one that converted to Protestantism and emigrated with the Anabaptist leader David Joris to Basel in 1544.

After changing their locations a number of times, those van Berchems settled in what is now Romandy, the French-speaking Western part of Switzerland, around 1764/65 and became citizens of the republic and canton of Geneva in 1816. Due to a "possible" family link with the otherwise extinct feudal house of the Berthout, the Swiss branch of the van Berchem family carried that surname since the 18th century as well. It acquired considerable wealth through marriages with other patrician families like the Saladin and the Sarasin. Max van Berchem's principal biographer Charles Genequand, a retired professor of Arabic philosophy and Islamic history at the University of Geneva, points out that both names – Saladin and Sarasin – sound Arabic and are thus a «striking illustration of the ancient Roman principle of nomen-omen.»

Max van Berchem's parents Alexandre (1836-1872), who inherited the Château de Crans from his maternal family side of Saladin, and Mathilde (née Sarasin,1838-1917), who inherited the Château des Bois in Satigny, were rentiers, who received an income from their assets and investments. The fact that they were both buried at the Cimetière des Rois ("Cemetery of Kings"), the city's "Panthéon" in Plainpalais, where the right to rest is strictly limited to distinguished personalities, illustrates the privileged status they enjoyed in Geneva's society. They were part of the patrician class which

«turned to banking and philanthropic activities at the end of the 19th century, after losing control of the major public offices in Geneva.»

Max was born in the Rue des Granges 12 of Geneva's Old Town as the second child of his parents after his brother Paul (1861-1947), who went on to become a pioneer physicist specialised in telegraphy, a member of the Grand Council of Vaud and military officer. In the following year, his brother Victor (1864-1938) was born, who went on to become a prominent historian and member of the Calvinist ecclesiastical court of the Protestant Church of Geneva. He also volunteered at the International Committee of the Red Cross (ICRC). Max and Victor had a particularly close relationship, which «was always like a summer without any clouds.»

After the early death of their father, the three brothers were raised by their mother with the help of her father Horace Sarasin (1808-1882) and her brother Edmond Sarasin (1843-1890). Max entertained a very close relationship with his mother, which he expressed in frequent exchanges of letters with her. From those correspondences it appears also that he inherited from her a major depressive disorder, from which he suffered throughout much of his adult life.

One of Max's greatest passions from early childhood on until the end of his life was performing music, especially playing the piano, and attending concerts.

=== Education ===
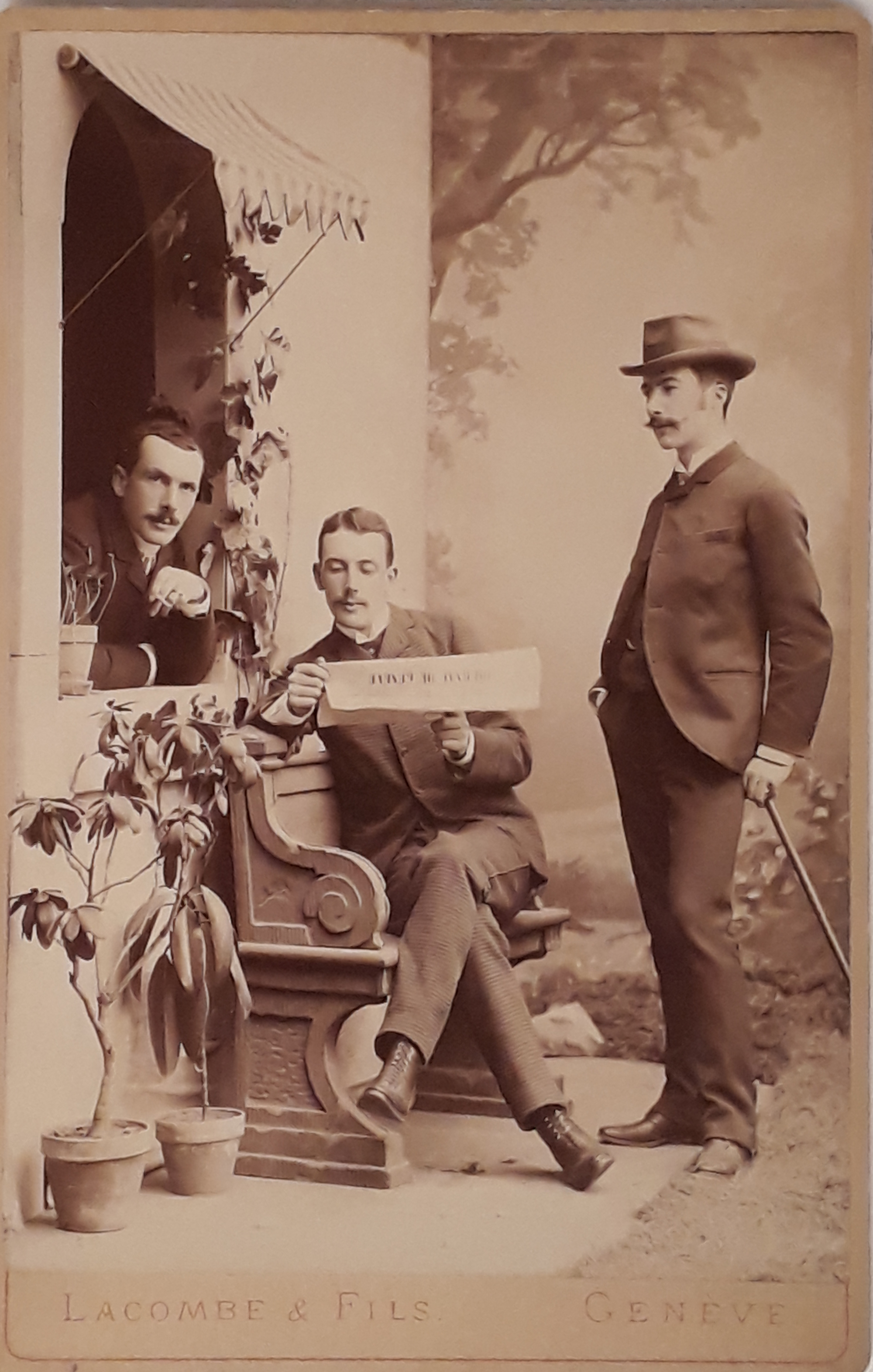
Victor, Paul and Max (from left to right) around 1882

In 1877, at the age of fourteen years, Max van Berchem moved to Stuttgart with his brother Paul to attend a secondary school for two years. From 1879 until 1881 he completed his secondary education in Geneva.

In 1881 he moved to Leipzig to study ancient and oriental languages (Hebrew, Arabic, Assyrian, Persian etc.) and art history. Major sources of inspiration for these interests were van Berchem's elder cousin Lucien Gautier (1850-1924), a professor of Hebrew and Old Testament exegesis at the University of Lausanne, and the eminent Egyptologist Édouard Naville (1844-1926). He was a remote relative as well and hailed from Geneva's second-oldest family. One of his teachers at Leipzig University, which was at that time a centre of oriental studies, was Heinrich Leberecht Fleischer (1801-1888), the founder of Arab studies in Germany who himself had studied under the mentorship of Silvestre de Sacy - the founder of Arab studies in the Western world - in Paris.

In April 1883, Max van Berchem moved to Strasbourg to study during the summer semester at the Kaiser-Wilhelm-University under the mentorship of Theodor Nöldeke (1836-1930), another eminent German orientalist and author of the standard work "The History of the Qur’ān". In the summer of that year, van Berchem returned to Switzerland to do a part of his military service.

In late 1883, Max van Berchem moved to Berlin to continue his studies at the Friedrich Wilhelm University, where he joined his brother Victor. His main academic inspiration there became Eduard Sachau (1845-1930), a professor for Semitic philology who - unlike some of his "armchair" colleagues - based his expertise also on travels in the Middle East. In the summer of the following year, van Berchem once again returned to Switzerland to do another part of his military service.

Sachau also became the supervisor of his doctoral thesis on land ownership and land tax under the rule of the first caliphate (La propriété territorial et l'impôt sous les premiers califes). In March 1986, at the age of just 23, he obtained his degree with maxima cum laude from Leipzig University.

In September 1886, Max van Berchem participated in the 7th Congress of Orientalists in Vienna with Édouard Naville.

=== Research activities and private life ===
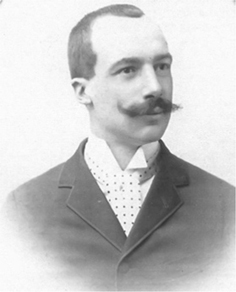
Max van Berchem at the age of 25

At the end of the same year, he travelled for the first time to the Arab world, accompanied by his mother, who was seeking to spend the winter in a warm and dry climate for health reasons. They travelled via Marseille to Egypt and arrived on the 8 December 1886 in Alexandria, from where they immediately moved on to Cairo. There he found an Arabic teacher – Ali Baghat, who went on to become the conservator of the Museum of Arab Art – and took language lessons in the mornings, especially in colloquial Arabic. During the afternoons he toured the city, often guided by Édouard Naville, and started taking photographs to document historical sites, especially in the Old Town. It was during those trips that van Berchem developed his particular interest in monuments and their Arabic inscriptions. In late April 1887, at the end of his stay, he presented the first results of his research at the Institut Égyptien.

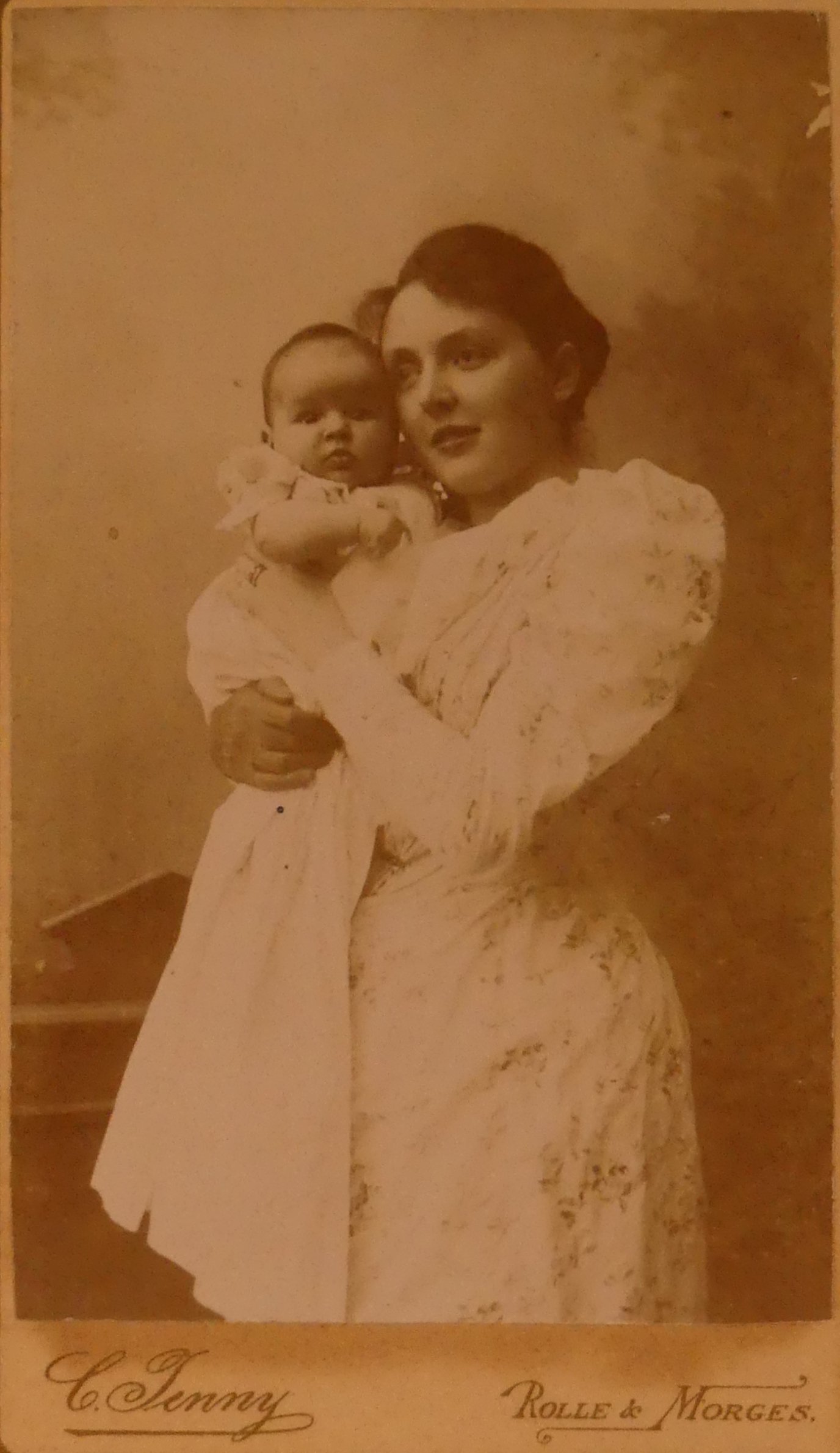
Élisabeth and Baby Marguerite

In autumn 1887, van Berchem went to London where he was introduced into numismatics. His teacher was, upon recommendation by Édouard Naville, the English orientalist and archaeologist Stanley Lane-Poole, who hailed from a famous orientalist family. Due to a bout of depression he cancelled a scheduled trip to Oxford and also gave up plans for a stay in Paris on his way back to Switzerland. It is the first recorded instance of the mental disorder which he suffered from throughout his adult life. His condition at that time was so alarming that his elder brother Paul urgently went to London at the beginning of December to accompany him home where the three brothers had the first reunion in many years.

In February 1888, Max van Berchem returned to Egypt, accompanied by his brother Victor and by Naville. In contrast to his first stay in Cairo, this second one was more of a touristic nature and included travels to Philae, Aswan and a boat trip on the River Nile. In late March, the two brothers left for Jaffa and from there to Jerusalem. After stops in Bethlehem, Hebron, at the Dead Sea, and in Jericho, they arrived in Damascus in late April. From there they descended to Beirut to take a boat to Constantinople, with stops in Tripoli, Smyrna, and other places. After his return to Switzerland, Max van Berchem did yet another part of his army service. For the winter of 1888/89 he moved to Paris, where he devoted his time both to studies and to music, his life-long passion.

Following his participation at the 8th Congress of Orientalists in Stockholm in September 1889, Max van Berchem returned in December of that year to Cairo where he started a campaign to systematically collect Arabic inscriptions. He was especially encouraged to do this by the French orientalist Eugène-Melchior de Vogüé, who had been attaché to the legations in the Ottoman Empire and now urged van Berchem to document as many inscriptions as possible, since many were lost already to modern buildings.

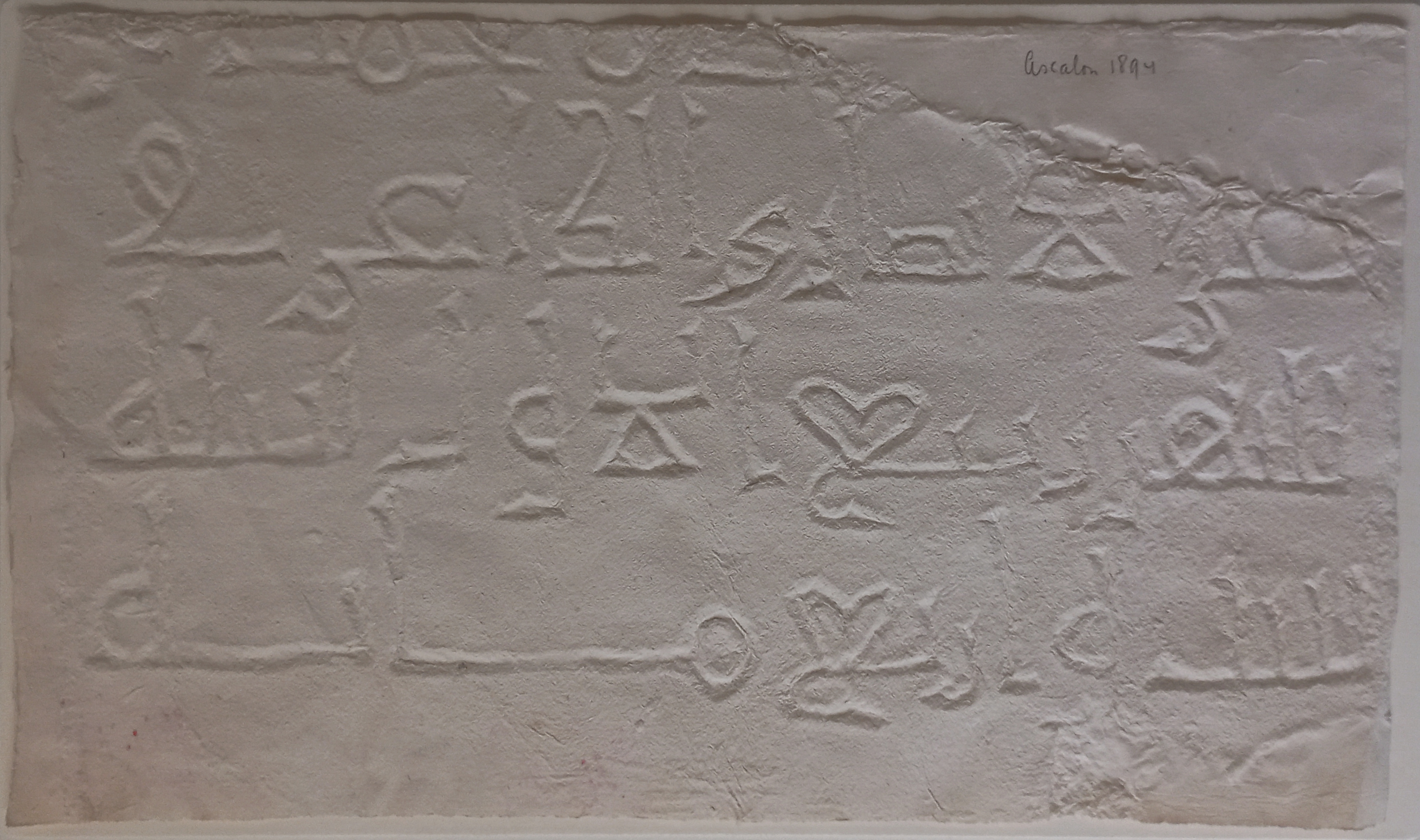
Squeeze rubbing of an epitaph from Syria which van Berchem took in 1894, dated to 1015 CE

On 9 June 1891, Max van Berchem married Elisabeth Lucile Frossard de Saugy, whose artistocratic parents both had a background of serving at the royal court of Bavaria. On 11 April 1892, Elisabeth gave birth to Marguerite Augusta. In 1892, Max van Berchem laid out his plan to create a compendium of Arabic inscriptions in a letter to the French orientalist Charles Barbier de Meynard (1826-1908), who was a member of the Académie des Inscriptions et Belles-Lettres and president of the Société asiatique. He reasoned:

«Islamic monuments are in a state of neglect, their ruins, though beautiful yet, will soon be no more than the shapeless remains of a glorious artistic past; the historical inscriptions they bear are vanishing. We must immediately catalogue all texts engraved on mosques, tombs, caravanserais, madrasas, fortified castles, and bridges, we must photograph monuments, explore all Muslim regions, study all of the many objects that sit in museums and private collections, and systematically publish these texts so as to make them into a living commentary of Islamic institutions.»

At the end of the same year, he undertook his third journey to Egypt. This time he was accompanied by his wife Elisabeth, who acquired basic Arabic language skills by taking lessons from Ali Baghat. Their stay was altogether more touristic in nature though. After some three months in Cairo they departed in early March 1893 to Jerusalem, where they stayed for three weeks, before travelling via Beirut to Damascus, which Max on that occasion found more interesting than Cairo in terms of unpublished inscriptions. Accordingly, he started documenting as many of them as possible.

Shortly after their return to Switzerland, on 31 May 1893, Victor van Berchem married Isabelle Blanche Naville, a daughter of Édouard Naville. Just two days later, "tragically", Élisabeth died in Satigny at the age of just 23 years.

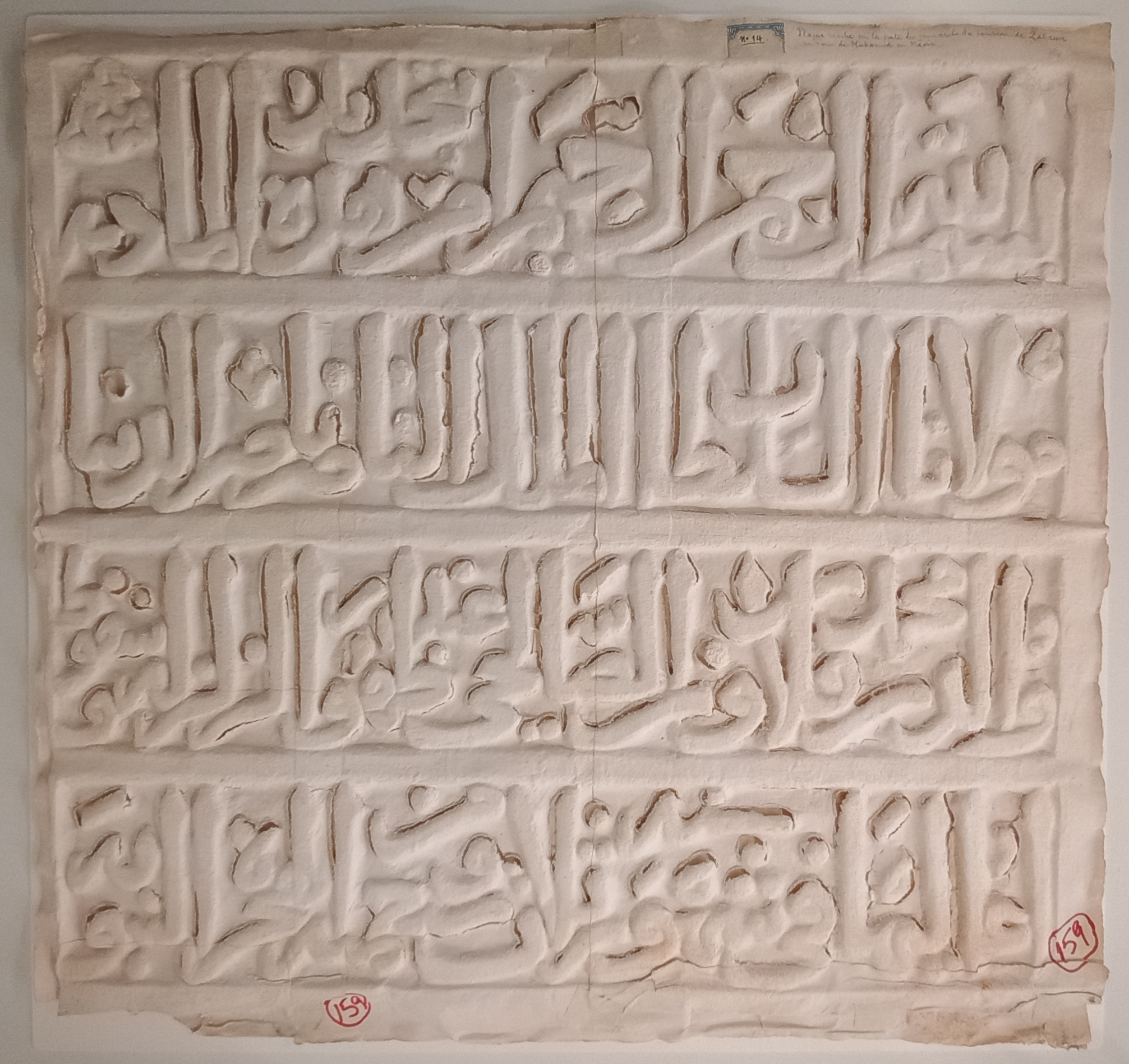
Squeeze rubbing from the Madrasa of Sultan Malik Mansur Qalawun in Cairo, dated 1325 CE

Following this heavy stroke of fate, Max van Berchem travelled to Paris in the autumn of 1893, where he discussed his plans to publish the collected inscriptions with Barbier de Meynard, the Egyptologist Gaston Maspero (1846-1916), and the archaeologist Charles Simon Clermont-Ganneau (1846-1923) at the Académie des Inscriptions et Belles Lettres.

In the beginning of April 1894, van Berchem travelled via Alexandria, Beirut and Hauran, where he was joined by two German diplomats with a shared interest in epigraphy, to Damascus. After about one month of collecting inscriptions there, he spent the next month in Jerusalem for the same purpose, followed by a tour through Southern Palestine, including Beit Jibrin, Gaza, Ramla, and Hebron.

Upon his return to Geneva, van Berchem joined the organising committee of the 10th Congress of Orientalists which was held in his hometown during the first half of September 1894 and chaired by Édouard Naville, the father-in-law of his brother Victor. Apart from Naville and van Berchem, Geneva was also home to two other eminent Orientalists: Ferdinand de Saussure, an expert for the Indo-Iranian languages, and the sinologist François Turrettini. The conference was attended by a large number of scholars.

Still in the same year, he published the first volume of the Matériaux pour un Corpus Inscriptionum Arabicarum, which dealt with inscriptions from Cairo.

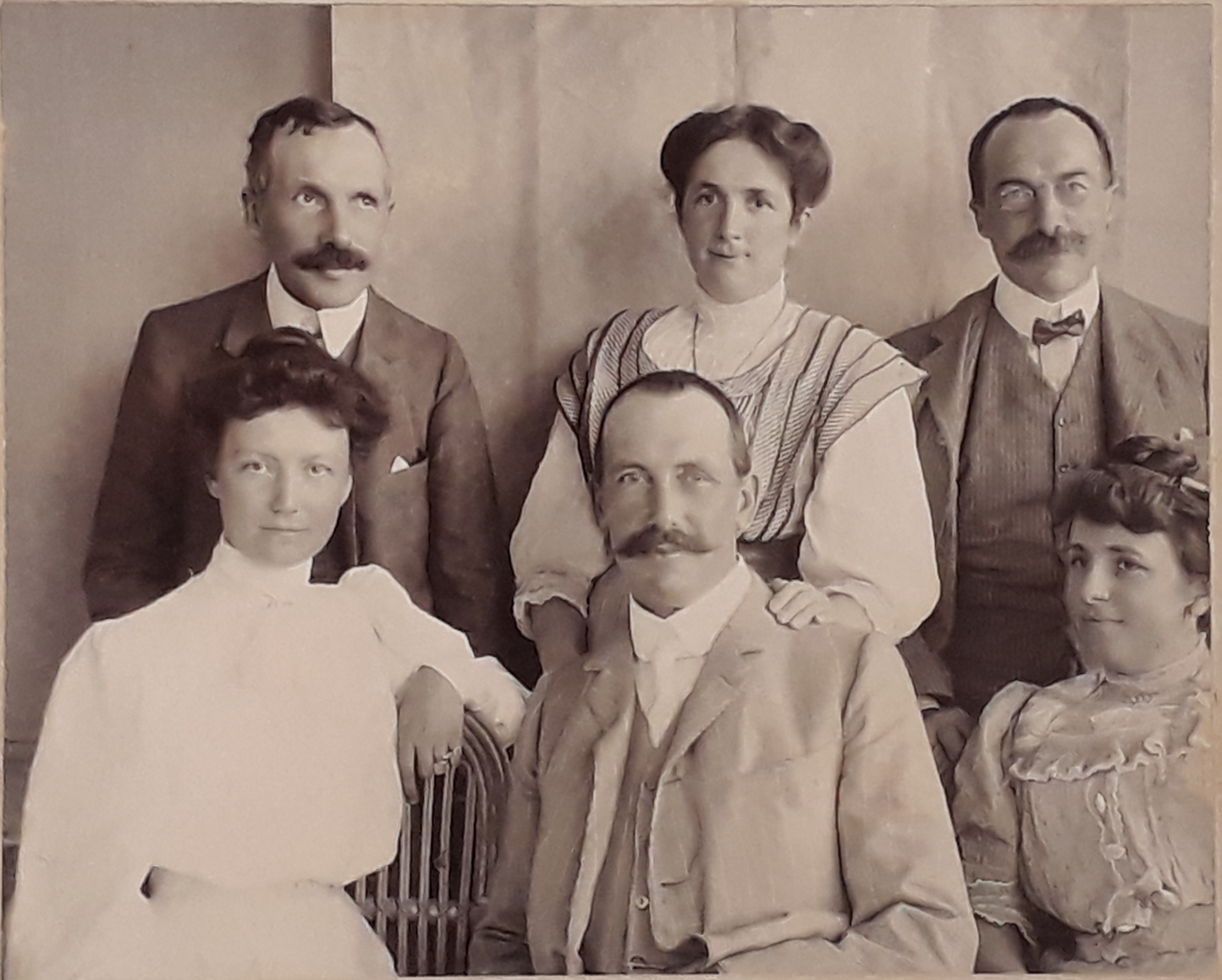
Victor, Paul and Max with their respective wives Isabelle Naville, Alice Hechter and Alice Naville (from left)

In April 1895, van Berchem travelled once again to Syria, this time with the architect Edmond Fatio, who originated from another Patrician family in Geneva and was - like Victor van Berchem - married to a daughter of Édouard Naville. The journey was focused on rural Syria, which was difficult to access and featured relatively few inscriptions. The tour led them from Beirut via Tripoli to Homs, Hama, Aleppo, Antiochia, Latakia, and back. It was to be his last trip to the region for almost twenty years.

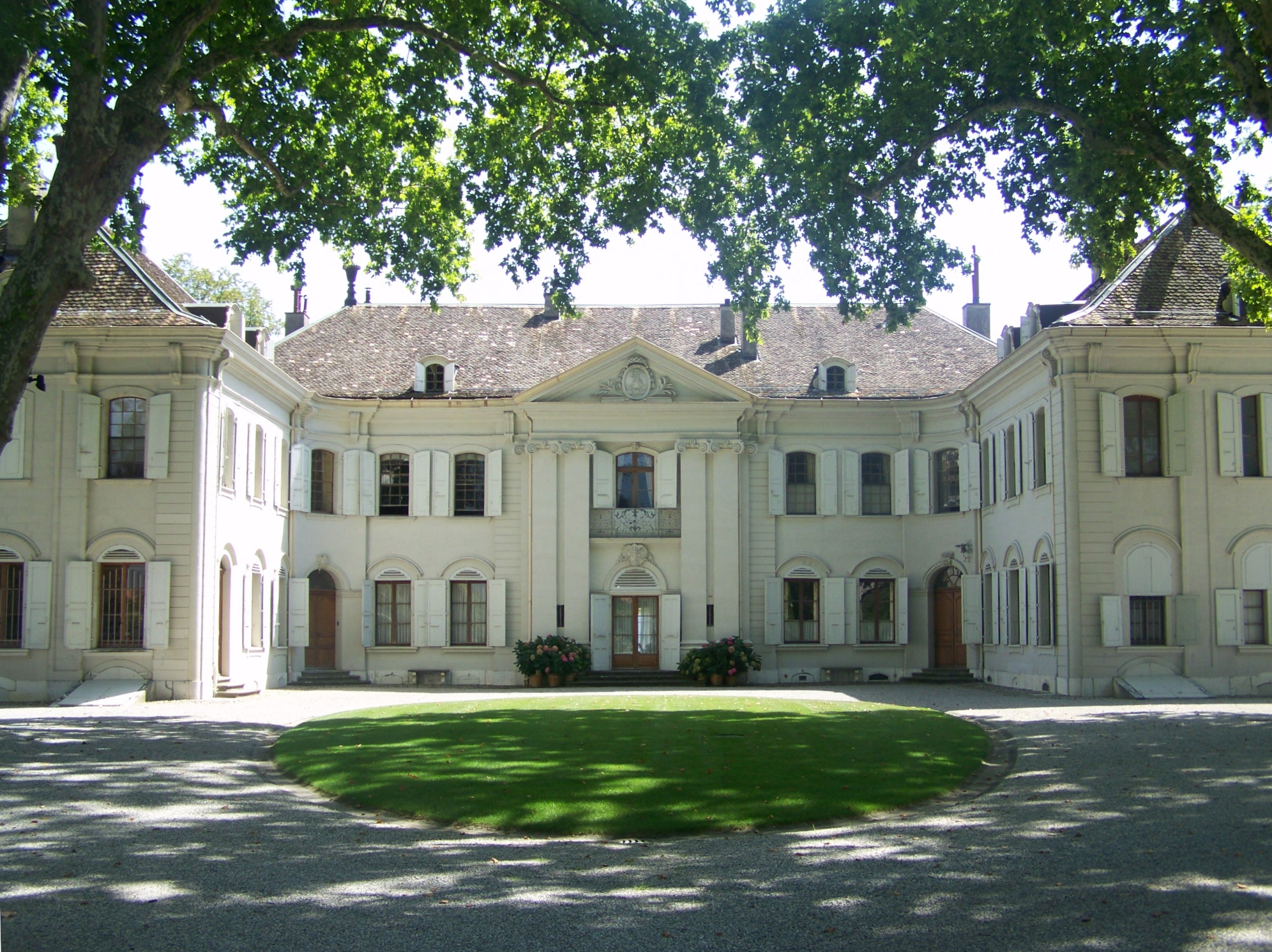
The Château de Crans

Following his return to Europe, Max van Berchem spent the autumn of 1895 in Paris. During an extended stay there, which lasted until the beginning of 1896, he prepared several study papers and networked with other orientalists. Still in 1896, he published the second volume of the Corpus from the series dealing with inscription from Cairo.

In late March 1896, Max van Berchem got remarried to Alice Catherine Naville (1873-1938), who was a remote cousin of Édouard Naville and thus a remote relative of Max as well. Her father Albert (1841–1912) was a teacher of history at a girls college and her mother a scioness of another prominent family, best known for their theologians: the Turrettini. Max van Berchem's maternal grandmother was born Turrettini as well, wherefore the Château des Bois was also called Turretin.

Max and Alice van Berchem had six children, five daughters and one son: Marie Rachel (1897-1953), Marcelle Thérèse Marguerite (1898-1953), Hélène (1900-1968), Horace Victor (1904-1982), Irène (1906-1995), and Thérèse Marguerite (1909-1995). They grew up in the Château de Crans, surrounded by vineyards and overlooking Lake Genevea. In the extensive letter correspondences of Max van Berchem the first-born Marguerite was the only one of his seven children though, who he distinctly mentioned.

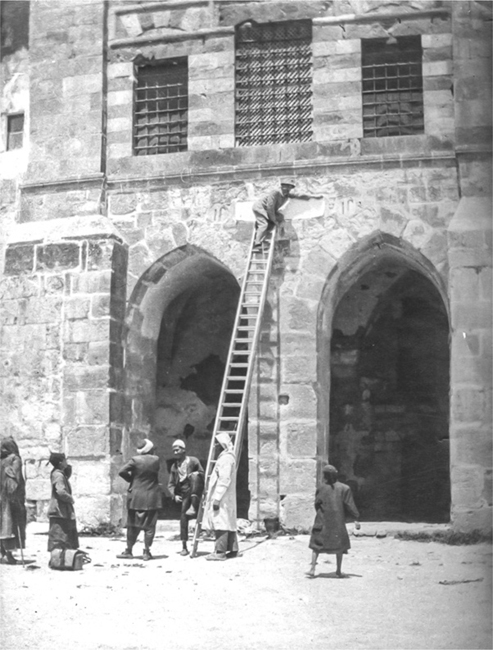
Van Berchem on a ladder at the north wall of the Temple Mount taking a squeeze in 1914

Apart from those family affairs, Max van Berchem dedicated most of his time and energy during the first years of the new century towards the publication of the large amounts of textual material that he had accumulated. For this purpose he established his library in an apartment at 3 Cour Saint-Pierre of Geneva's Old Town. In 1900 and 1903 he published the third and fourth volumes of the Corpus for Cairo. Subsequently, he focussed on the one hand side on publishing the inscriptions he had collected himself in Jerusalem and Damascus. On the other hand, with regard to the enormity of a Corpus project for large parts of the Arabic world, he formed an international network of collaborators and divided the work amongst others, mostly French and German scholars, which required great diplomatic skills: His main partners on Syria became the German orientalists Moritz Sobernheim (1872-1933) and Ernst Herzfeld (1879-1948). The amicable and productive relations he entertained «with so many querulous and self-centred academics» demonstrate that

«van Berchem was an exceptional human being with a positive genius for friendship.»

The only trip that Max van Berchem did outside of Europe during those years was a journey to Algiers where he attended the 14th Congress of Orientalists in 1905. The Maghreb, however, was not a priority for his studies, since its inscriptions were already being published by French scholars.

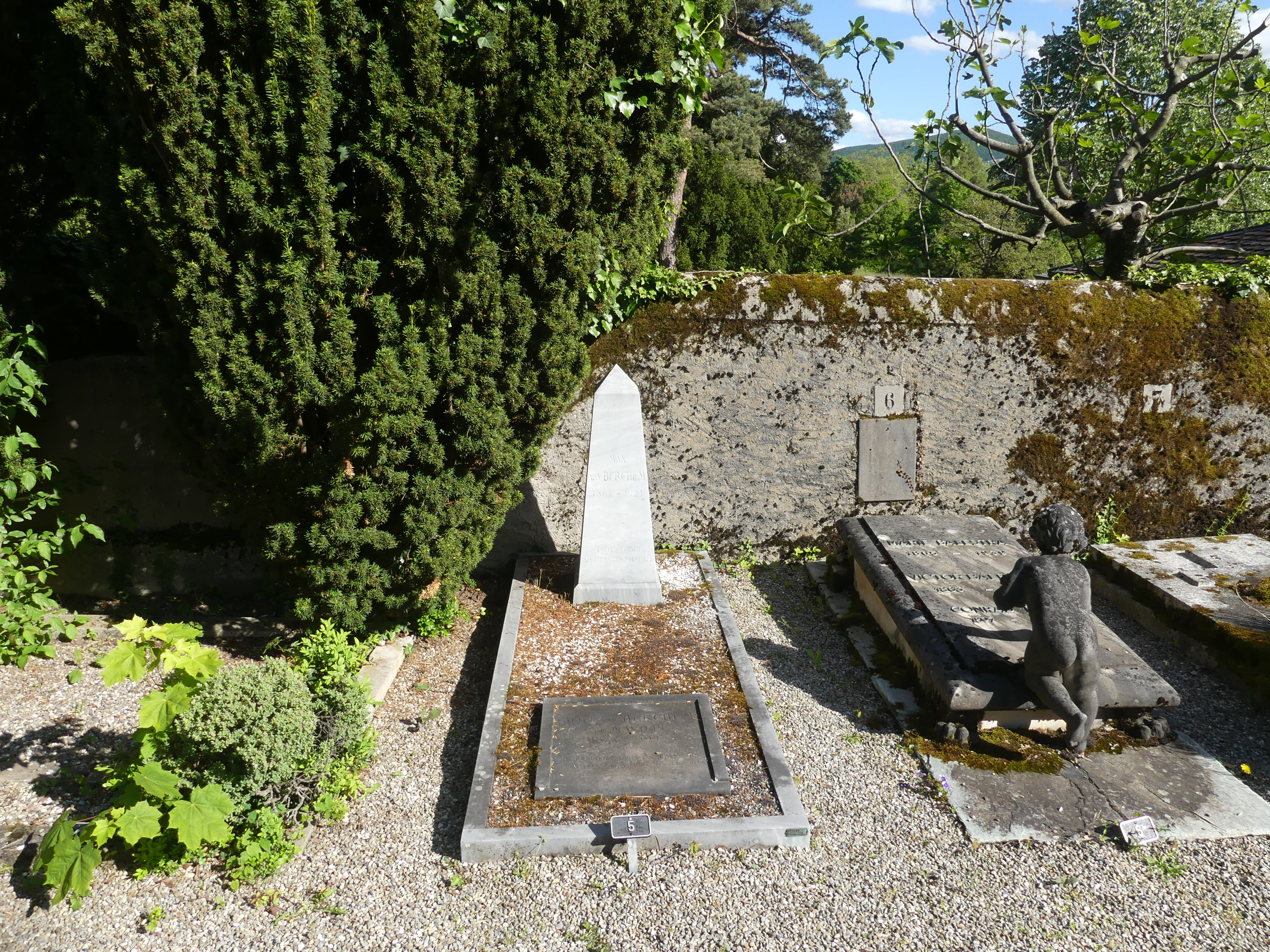
Van Berchem's grave

It was only in 1913 that van Berchem returned to the Middle East, this time travelling with his wife to Anatolia, where they met for the first time Max' friend and collaborator Halil Edhem, the general director of the Istanbul Museum.

In early 1915, van Berchem was offered a professorship by the University of Lausanne to replace the late epigraphist Jean Spiro (1847-1914), but he declined.

In early 1919, van Berchem was hospitalised and had surgery for unknown reasons.

In late 1920, van Berchem travelled to Egypt to supervise the printing of the Corpus for Jerusalem. When van Berchem fell ill in Cairo, he hastily returned to Switzerland and was hospitalised in the clinic "Vers la Rive" in Vaumarcus at Lake Neuchâtel. There he died nine days before his 58th birthday, almost exactly four years after the death of his mother. His death certificate recorded pneumonia as the immediate cause of his death. It also noted that van Berchem had "no occupation" (sans profession).

Van Berchem and his second wife Alice are buried at the Ancien Cimetière in Cologny, one of the richest municipalities in the Canton of Geneva. The grave of his oldest daughter Marguerite Gautier-van Berchem (1892 – 1984) is just a few meters away. The inscription on his gravestone, a white obelisk, quotes 2 Corinthians 5:17:

«TOUTES CHOSES SERONT FAITES NOUVELLES» ("all things will have become new")

== Legacy ==
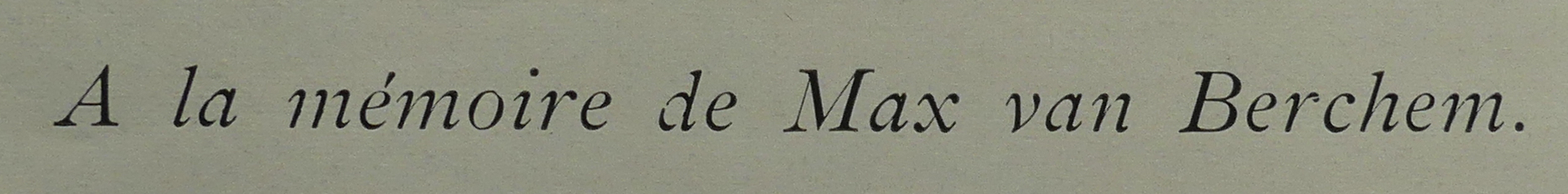
Dedication in the book "Mosaïques chrétiennes du IVme au Xme siècle"

Still in 1921, van Berchem's widow Alice donated a part of his collection of artefacts to Geneva's Musée d’art et d’histoire (MAH).

The Villa Saladin-van Berchem
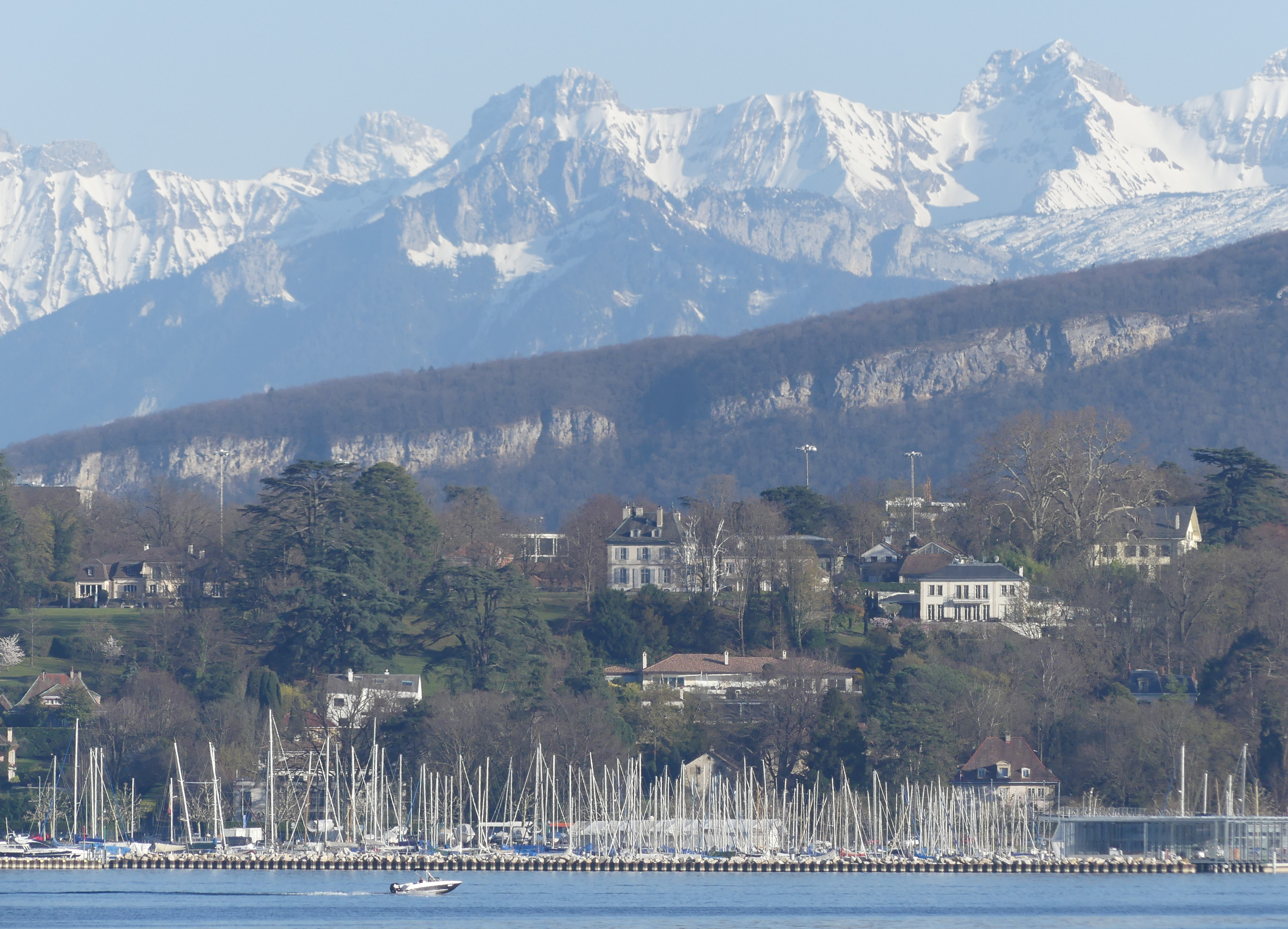
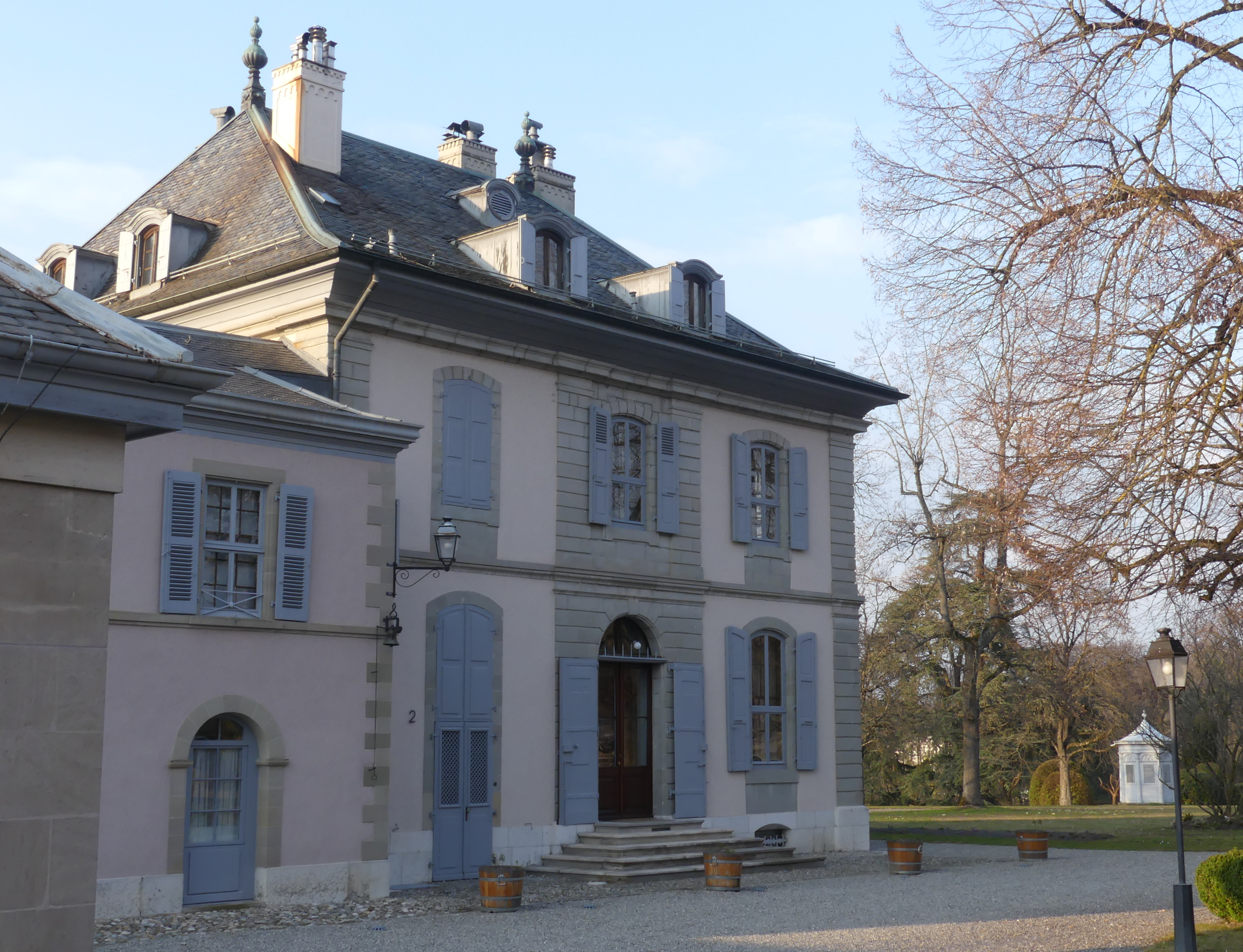

Van Berchem's work was partly continued by his oldest daughter Marguerite (1892 – 1984) who also played a prominent role in the ICRC since the First World War. Following what was apparently her father's wish, she focused her interest on mosaics. Based on study trips, especially to Italy, she published in 1924 a book about Christian mosaics from the 4th to 10th centuries with drawings by her younger half-sister Marcelle and in collaboration with the archivist and palaeographer Étienne Clouzot (1881–1944).

In the second half of the 1920s, the architectural historian Keppel Archibald Cameron Creswell entrusted her with the study of the mosaics of the Dome of the Rock in Jerusalem and of the Great Mosque of Damascus. As an Inspector of Monuments in the Occupied Enemy Territory Administration (OETA) – the joint British, French and Arab military administration over parts of the Levant and Mesopotamia (1917–1920) – he had entertained friendly relations with Max van Berchem, whom he admired. The results of Marguerite van Berchem's research on the two religious sites, where her father had done epigraphic studies, were published by Creswell in 1932 as an independent part under her own name in the first volume of his seminal work Early Muslim Architecture. In later years, she particularly focused on exploring the ruins of Sedrata in the Algerian Sahara.

In 1973, Gautier-van Berchem, who married the banker Bernard Gautier in 1966, donated the Villa Saladin-van Berchem to the Swiss Confederation. Max van Berchem had inherited the estate with its surrounding park after the death of his mother in 1917, while the Château de Crans went to his older brother Paul and the Château des Bois to his younger brother Victor. The mansion, which was built in 1715 at the Plateau de Frontenex in Cologny overlooking Lake Geneva, was the home of his aunt Augusta Sarasin, who survived him. Marguerite van Berchem purchased it in 1955, apparently by paying out the inheritance shares to her half-siblings. Since she did not have immediate heirs of her own and did not want the estate to fall into foreign hands, she gave it to the government under the condition that the state of the architectural ensemble would stay inalienable. The villa has served since then as the residence of the permanent representative of Switzerland to the United Nations Office at Geneva.

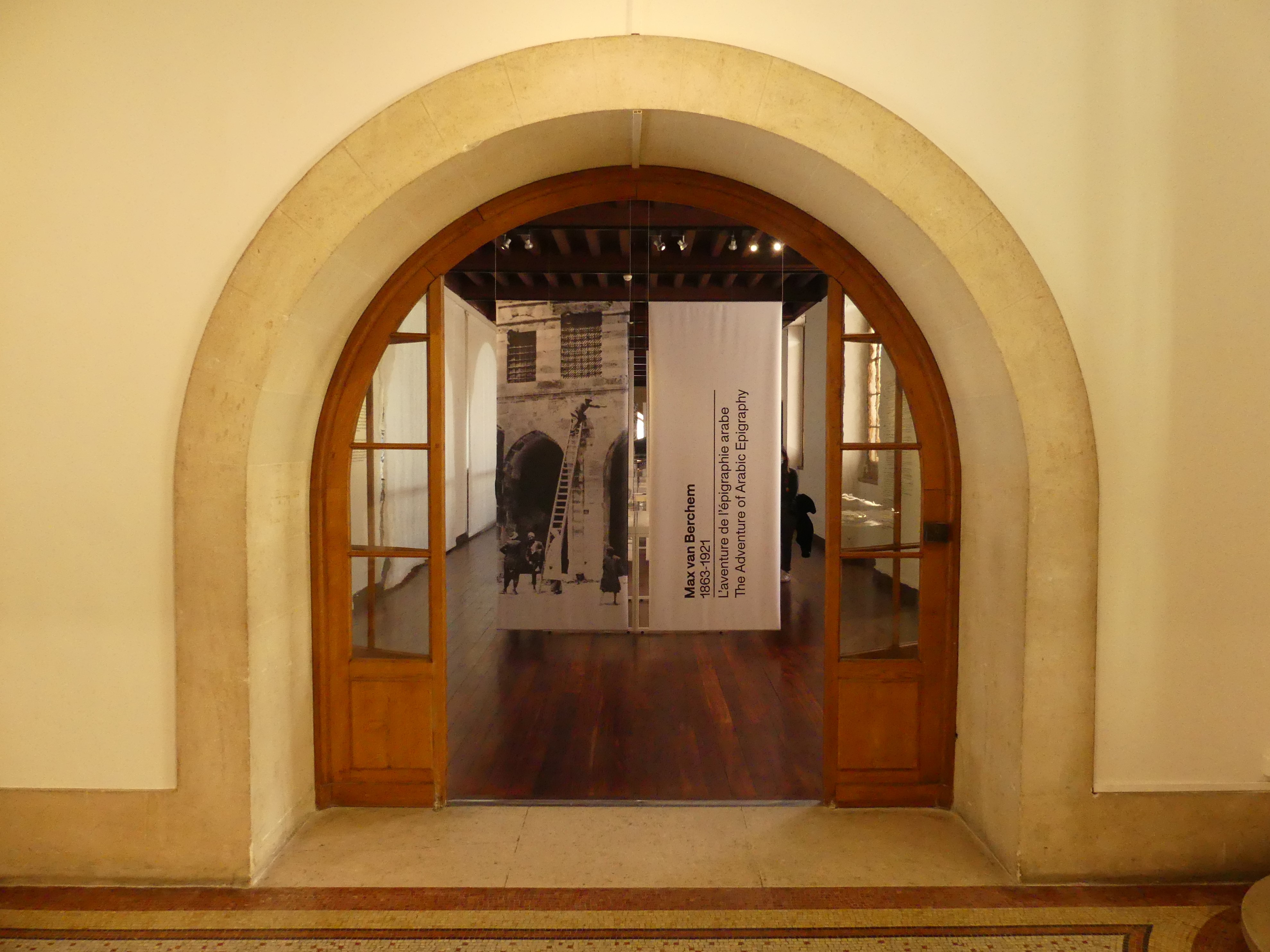
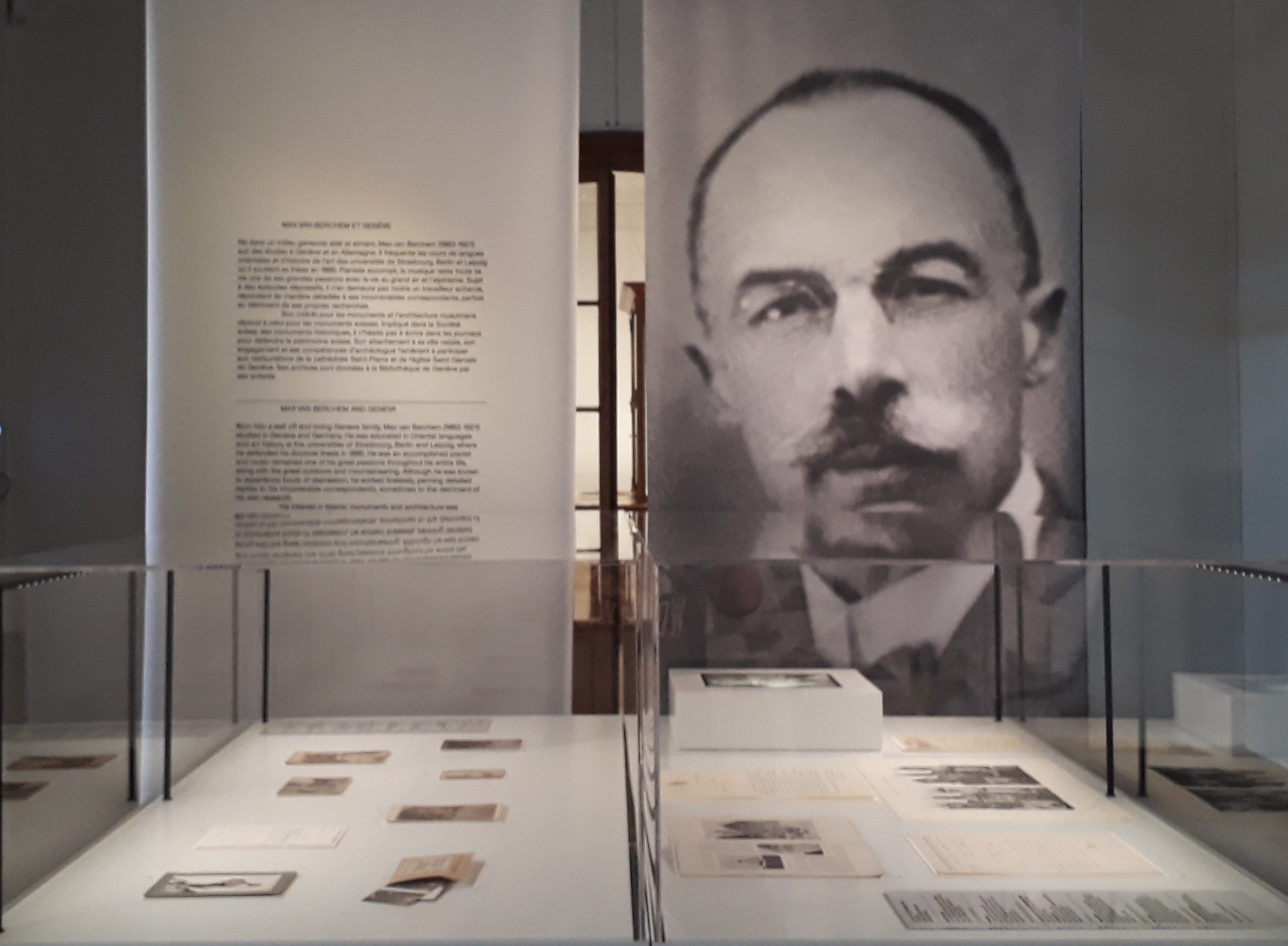
The centennial exhibition at the MAH

In the same year, 1973, upon the initiative of Gautier-van Berchem, the Fondation Max van Berchem was established. Already two year earlier, Gautier-van Berchem and her half-brother Horace had donated the archives of their father to the Bibliothèque de Genève. It kept the ownership of the archives but in 1987 deposited its main part on the premises of the Foundation in the Champel quarter of Geneva, with the exception of van Berchem's correspondences and the Etienne Combe papers.

Thus, the Foundation with the main archives and its specialised library has served on the one hand side as a documentation centre for Arabic epigraphy. On the other side, it also funds archaeological missions, research programs and study projects about Islamic art and architecture in a multitude of countries, not only in the Arabic world. As of 2021, the Foundation's Board is made up of four members of the van Berchem and Gautier families. The president of the foundation's scientific committee – Max van Berchem's biographer Charles Genequand – is a member as well. The scientific committee, which was created in 1985, advises the board on project proposals. It consists of ten international experts, including one family member.

On the occasion of the 100th anniversary of Max van Berchem's death, the MAH honoured him in cooperation with his namesake foundation and the Bibliothèque de Genève from 16 April until 6 June 2021 by hosting the exposition

«The adventure of Arabic epigraphy».

== Associated works ==
- Matériaux pour un Corpus inscriptionum Arabicarum (1894-1925).
- Berchem, van, M. (1894). Matériaux pour un Corpus inscriptionum Arabicarum (in French and Arabic). Paris: Ernest Leroux.
- Berchem, van, M. (1909). MIFAO 25 Matériaux pour un Corpus Inscriptionum Arabicarum Part 2 Syrie du Nord (in French and Arabic). Cairo: Impr. de l'Institut français d'archéologie orientale.
- Berchem, van, M. (1914). MIFAO 37 Voyage en Syrie t.1 (in French and Arabic). Cairo: Impr. de l'Institut français d'archéologie orientale.
- Berchem, van, M. (1915). MIFAO 38 Voyage en Syrie T.2 Additions et corrections. Index général (in French and Arabic). Cairo: Impr. de l'Institut français d'archéologie orientale.
- Berchem, van, M. (1917). MIFAO 29 Materiaux Pour Un Corpus Inscriptionum Arabicarum III Asie Mineure (in French and Arabic). Vol. Siwas, Diwrigi. Cairo: Impr. de l'Institut français d'archéologie orientale.
- Berchem, van, M. (1920). MIFAO 45.1 Matériaux pour un Corpus Inscriptionum Arabicarum Part 2 Syrie du Sud T.3 Jérusalem Index général. Cairo: Impr. de l'Institut français d'archéologie orientale.
- Berchem, van, M. (1920). MIFAO 45.2 Matériaux pour un Corpus Inscriptionum Arabicarum Part 2 Syrie du Sud T.3 Fasc. 2 Jérusalem Index général. Cairo: Impr. de l'Institut français d'archéologie orientale.
- Berchem, van, M. (1922). Materiaux Pour Un Corpus Inscriptionum Arabicarum (in French and Arabic). Vol. 2 part, 1 volume. Cairo: Impr. de l'Institut français d'archéologie orientale.
- Berchem, van, M. (1922). Materiaux Pour Un Corpus Inscriptionum Arabicarum (in French and Arabic). Vol. 2 part, 1 volume, premier fasicule. Cairo: Impr. de l'Institut français d'archéologie orientale.
- Berchem, van, M. (1922). MIFAO 43 Matériaux pour un Corpus Inscriptionum Arabicarum Part 2 Syrie du Sud T.1 Jérusalem "Ville" (in French and Arabic). Cairo: Impr. de l'Institut français d'archéologie orientale.
  - Alt: Berchem, van, M. (1922). MIFAO 43 Matériaux pour un Corpus Inscriptionum Arabicarum Part 2 Syrie du Sud T.1 Jérusalem "Ville" (in French and Arabic). Cairo: Impr. de l'Institut français d'archéologie orientale.
- Berchem, van, M. (1927). MIFAO 44 Matériaux pour un Corpus Inscriptionum Arabicarum Part 2 Syrie du Sud T.2 Jérusalem Haram. Cairo: Impr. de l'Institut français d'archéologie orientale.
- Inscriptions arabes de Syrie, 1897 – Arab inscriptions of Syria.
- Epigraphie des Assassins de Syrie, 1897 – Epigraphy of the Assassins of Syria.
- Materialien zur älteren geschichte Armeniens und Mesopotamiens, (with Carl Ferdinand Friedrich Lehmann-Haupt), 1906 – Materials pertaining to the ancient history of the Armenians and Mesopotamians.
- Amida: Matériaux pour l'épigraphie et l'histoire musulmanes du Diyar-bekr, 1910 – Amida, material pertaining to the epigraphy and Islamic history of Diyarbakır.
- Voyage en Syrie, 1913 – Voyage to Syria.
- "Opera minora".
- La Correspondance entre Max Van Berchem et Louis Massignon: 1907-1919 – Correspondence with Louis Massignon, 1907–1919.
- Max van Berchem, 1863–1921: Hommages rendus à sa mémoire, by Alice van Berchem (1923).
- La Jérusalem musulmane dans l'œuvre de Max van Berchem by Marguerite Gautier-van Berchem, (1978).
- "Muslim Jerusalem in the work of Max van Berchem", by Marguerite Gautier-van Berchem (1982).
- "Corpus Inscriptionum Arabicarum Palaestinae addendum squeezes in the Max van Berchem collection (Palestine, Trans-Jordan, Northern Syria): squeezes 1-84", (2007).

== See also ==
- Gaston Wiet
