= François Turrettini =

François Turrettini may refer to:

- Francis Turretin, also known as François Turrettini, Genevan-Italian Reformed scholastic theologian
- François Turrettini (Sinologist), Swiss Sinologist and publisher
