= Marguerite Gautier-van Berchem =

Swiss archaeologist (1892–1984)

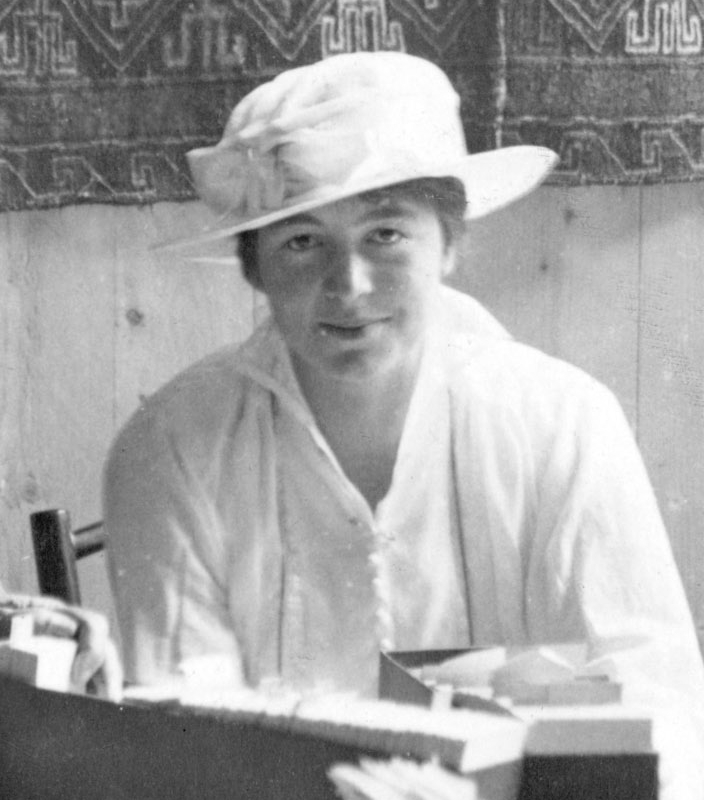
- van Berchem during WWI
- Born: 11 April 1892; Geneva, Switzerland
- Died: 23 January 1984 (aged 91); Geneva, Switzerland
- Occupation(s): Archaeologist, art historian

Signature
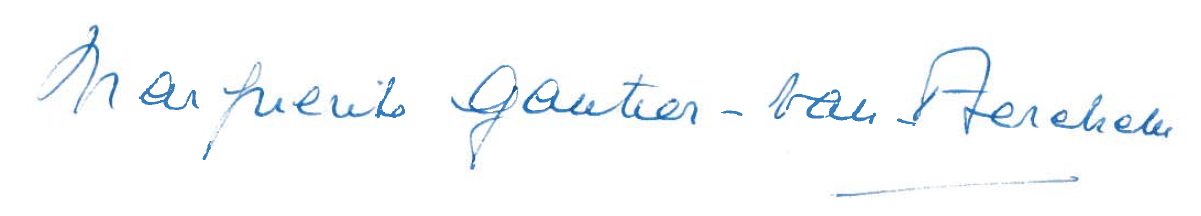

Marguerite Augusta Gautier-van Berchem (born Marguerite Augusta Berthout van Berchem; 11 April 1892 – 23 January 1984) was a Swiss archaeologist and art historian from a patrician family, who specialised both in early Christian art and early Islamic art. She was also an active member of the International Committee of the Red Cross (ICRC) and was one of the first women to hold a senior position there.

== Life ==
=== Family background and education ===
Marguerite's father Max van Berchem (1863–1921) was an orientalist and historian who undertook scientific expeditions to Egypt, Palestine, and Syria. He is known as a pioneer of Arabic epigraphy, who initiated the Corpus Inscriptionum Arabicarum, an important collection of Arabic inscriptions. Marguerite's paternal grandparents were Alexandre (1836–1872), who inherited the Château de Crans in Crans-près-Céligny from his maternal family, and Mathilde (née Sarasin,1838–1917), who inherited the Château des Bois (also called Turretin) in Satigny. Both were rentiers, who received an income from their assets. Their families were part of a patrician class that "turned to banking and philanthropic activities at the end of the 19th century, after losing control of the major public offices in Geneva."

On 11 June 1891, Max van Berchem married the 21-year-old Lucile Elisabeth Frossard de Saugy. On 11 April 1892, Marguerite was born. In the winter of 1892/93, Max and Alice van Berchem travelled together to Egypt, Palestine and Syria for several months, but it is unclear whether they took Marguerite with them on that journey. Elisabeth died on 2 June 1893 in Satigny, shortly after their return to Geneva, when Marguerite was just over one year old.

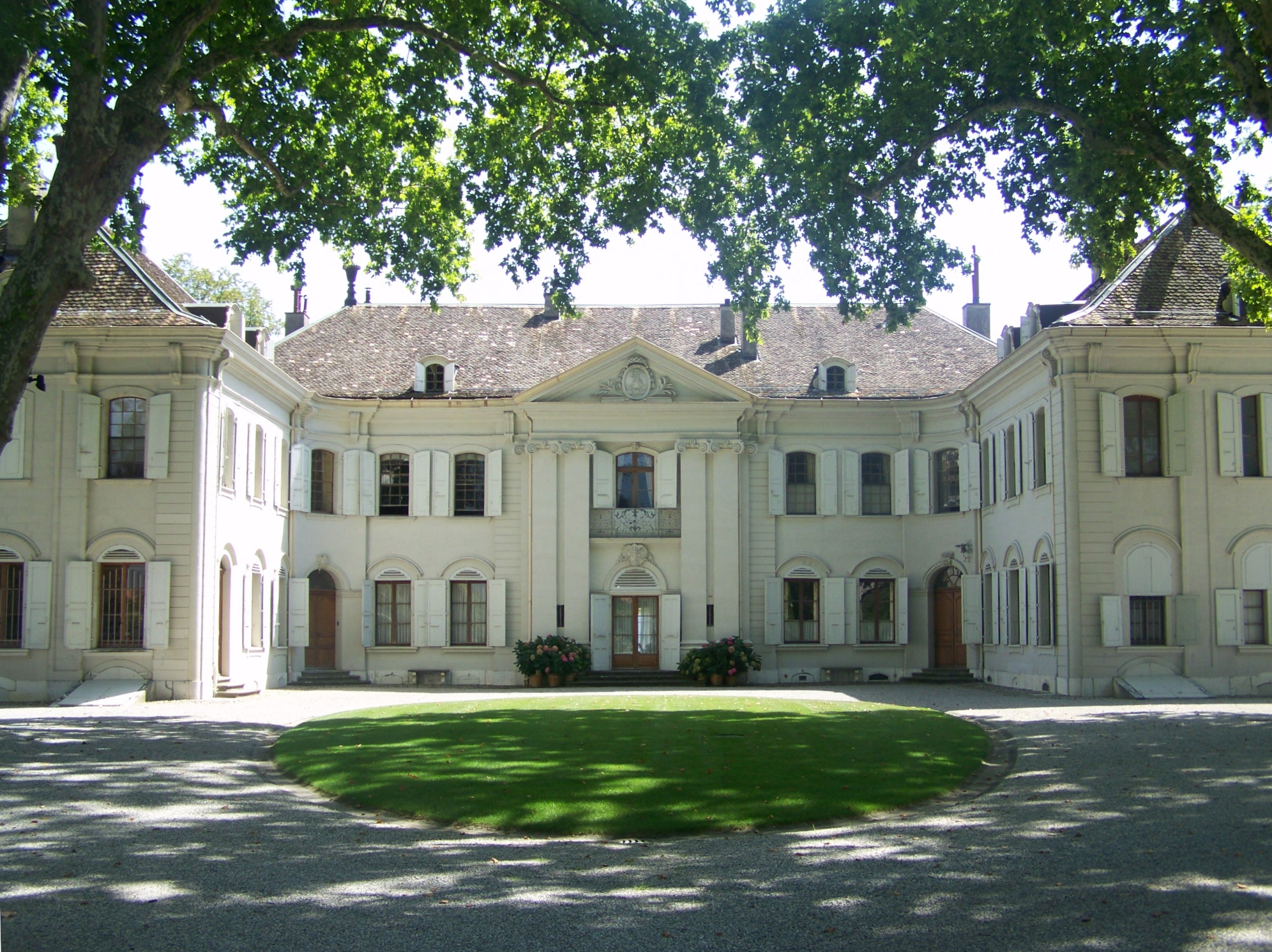
The Château de Crans

The widower remarried, to an Alice Naville, and had six more children with her: five daughters and one son. In the extensive letter correspondences of Max van Berchem, Marguerite was the only one of his seven children whom he writes about specifically.

Marguerite van Berchem grew up primarily in the family palace of Château de Crans on a vineyard overlooking Lake Geneva and "she received an excellent education in Modern languages, music and archaeology and was attracted to the East". Due to her privileged background, she was sent on to study archaeology at the prestigious École du Louvre et des Hautes Etudes in Paris.

=== World War I ===
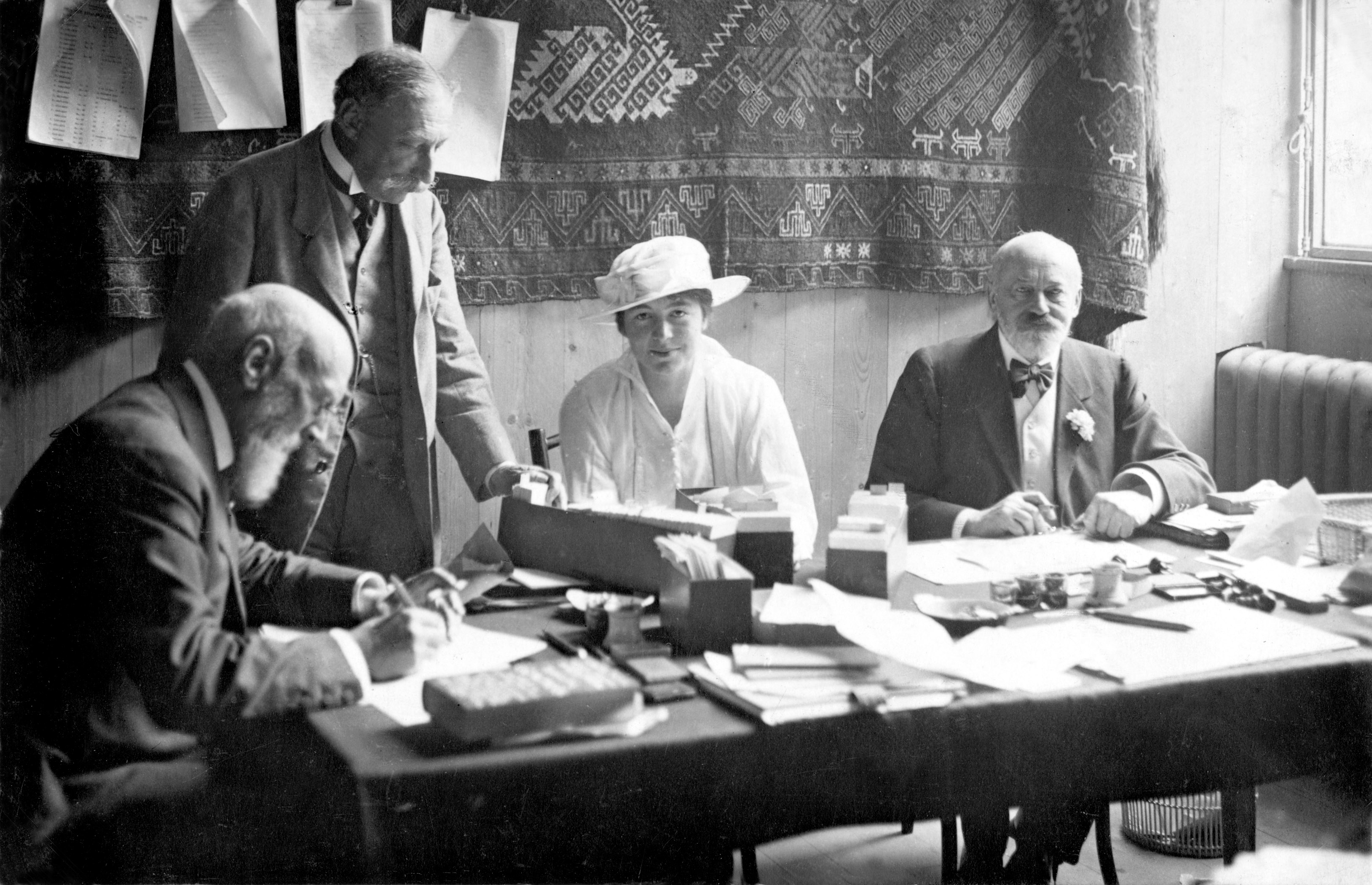
Van Berchem at the IPWA with writer Adolphe Chenevière, Emile Ador, and Léopold Favre (from left to right)

Portraits by Frédéric Boissonnas

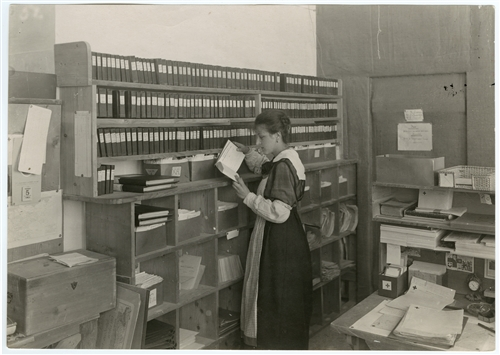
Van Berchem at the IPWA service for the disappeared and missing persons

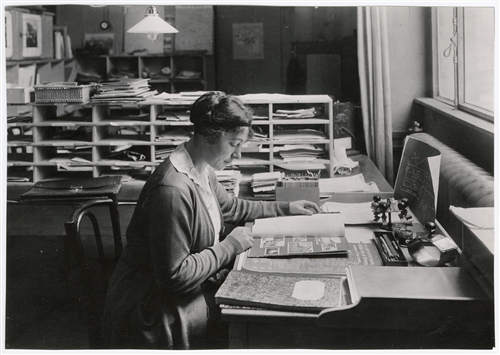
Van Berchem at the research service

Shortly after the outbreak of the First World War in 1914, the ICRC, under its president Gustave Ador, established the International Prisoners-of-War Agency (IPWA) to trace POWs and to re-establish communications with their respective families. Many of the staff were women. This group included female pioneers such as Marguerite Cramer, Lucie Odier, Suzanne Ferrière, and also van Berchem:

"Marguerite van Berchem selflessly devoted her time and effort to the work at hand, and was soon appointed head of the German Service, a position she filled with skill and efficiency."

=== Between the World Wars ===
In early 1921, van Berchem's father died from pneumonia at the age of just 58. Following what was apparently her father's wish, she focused her interest on mosaics. She lived in Italy for 14 years, and left at the outbreak of World War II. Based on her research there she published in 1924 a book about Christian mosaics from the fourth to the tenth centuries, with drawings made by her younger half-sister Marcelle, and in collaboration with Étienne Clouzot (1881–1944).

In the second half of the 1920s, she was encouraged by the architectural historian Keppel Archibald Cameron Creswell to study of the mosaics of the Dome of the Rock in Jerusalem and of the Great Mosque of Damascus. As an Inspector of Monuments in the Occupied Enemy Territory Administration (OETA), Cresswell had entertained friendly relations with Max van Berchem, whom he admired. The results of Marguerite van Berchem's research on the two religious sites, where her father had done epigraphic studies, were published in 1932, as an independent part under her own name in the first volume of Cresswell's seminal work Early Muslim Architecture.

At the same time, van Berchem kept volunteering for the ICRC. In 1934, for instance, she accompanied her fellow pioneering colleagues Marguerite Frick-Cramer and Lucie Odier to Tokyo, where they represented the organisation at the Fifteenth International Red Cross Conference.

=== World War II ===
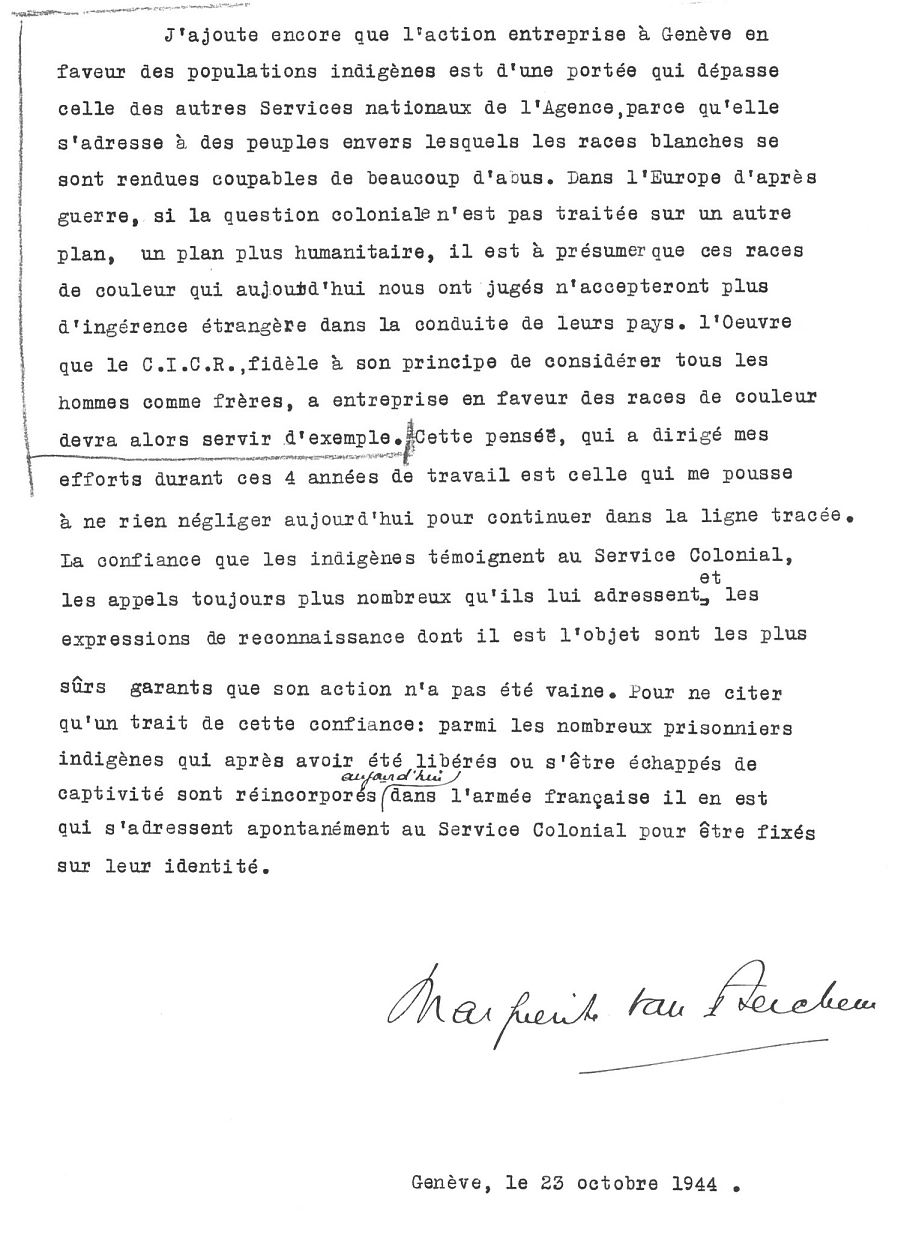
The letter from 23. October 1944 from the Tracing Archives of the ICRC archives

After her return to Geneva van Berchem joined the Central Agency for Prisoners of War of the ICRC, the successor of the IPWA. which was based on the 1929 Geneva Convention. In 1940/41, she played a key role in the creation of a service dedicated to handle the cases of the many POWs from the French colonies, who could thus receive family news and parcels. To master the challenges from this task, she recruited a team of specialists who had lived in the colonies.

From 1943, she also directed the auxiliary sections of the Agency, which by the end of the war had more than one thousand volunteers in 24 cities across Switzerland. On 23 October 1944 van Berchem wrote to the ICRC member Albert Lombard, asking for permission to continue work despite the fact that contact between the colonial service and its French partner organisations was cut off in autumn of 1944, stating that "the work undertaken in Geneva for indigenous people has an impact beyond that of the other national services of the Agency because it is addressed to people that have been much abused by whites."

=== Post-WWII ===
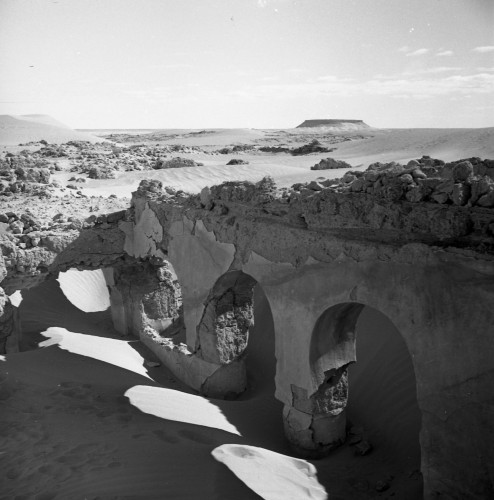
Sedrata vestiges – photo from van Berchem's project

One year after the end of the Second World War, van Berchem stressed in a publication her conviction that "differences in race, language and religion are no reasons that should divide the peoples, but that there are laws and profound links which may make this diversity a great wealth."

Still in 1946, van Berchem undertook a journey to Morocco and Algeria. In Algiers, her interest was sparked by stuccos at the National Museum of Antiquities and Islamic Art. The artworks were from Sedrata, a historical site some 800 km (500 mi) south of Algiers near the oasis of Ouargla in the Algerian Sahara, which had been a prospering Berber city during the 10th and 11th centuries. French archaeologists had excavated parts of it at the end of the 19th century, but the ruins were covered by the desert sands and largely forgotten again.

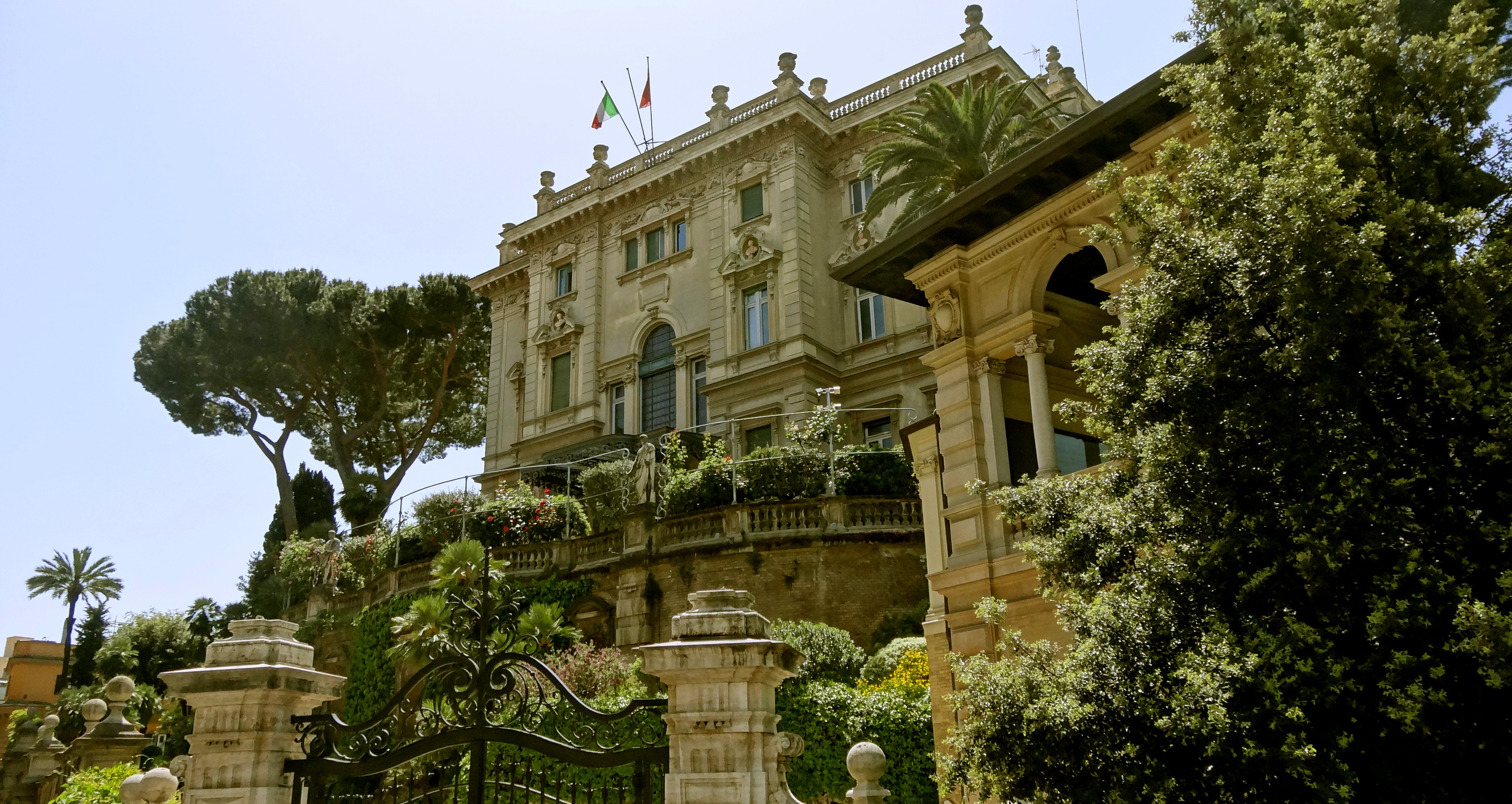
The Villa Maraini

In 1948, van Berchem returned to Rome, where she served as the de facto founding director of the Istituto Svizzero di Roma (ISR). The Swiss Federal Council had decided in the previous year to establish the cultural institute, which took its seat under van Berchem's leadership in the Villa Maraini on the Pincian Hill and was opened in 1949.

Following this episode, van Berchem undertook a second trip to Algeria in 1949 and another year later a first reconnaissance mission to Sedrata. This was followed by two systematic archaeological expeditions: in the course of the first one, which took place from the end of 1950 to the beginning of 1951, she used aerial archaeology to examine the extent of the site, including its streets and channels. A hydro-survey was conducted as well. Limited excavations discovered a large building that was decorated with columns and arches. The second campaign, which took place from late 1951 to early 1952, discovered a residential complex with finely decorated stucco panels. Some fifty boxes of finds were sent to Algiers. However, van Berchem had to give up the project altogether after the beginning of the Algerian Revolution in 1954. A large part of her findings were published posthumously in 2017.

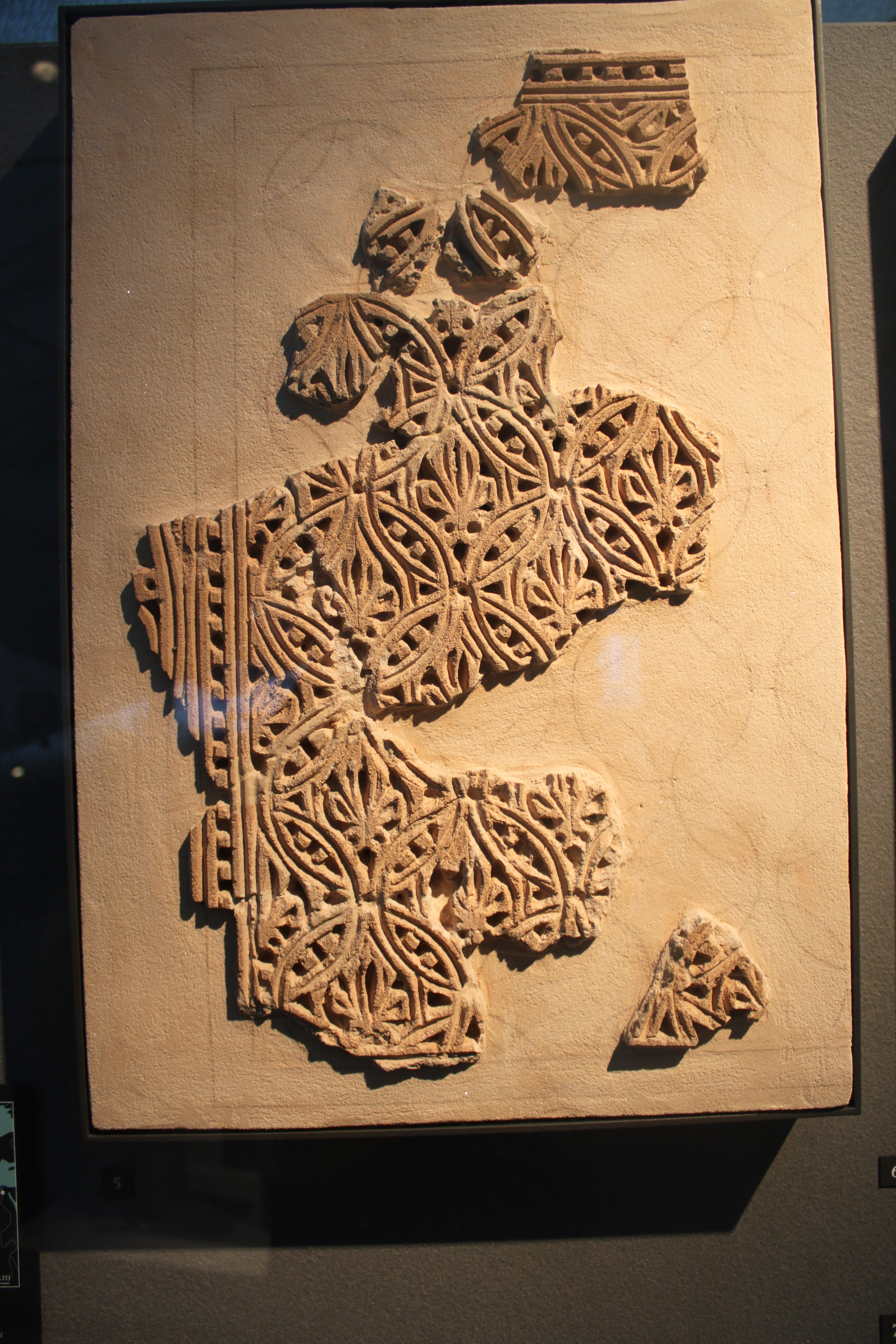
Stucco from Sedrata at the Louvre, excavated by van Berchem's team

In 1951, van Berchem was elected a member of the ICRC, joining her cousin René van Berchem, a banker, who was an ICRC member from 1946 to 1955. In contrast, Marguerite van Berchem remained a regular member for 18 years. During her tenure, she undertook missions to a number of countries, e.g. to Nepal and Jordan.

In 1966, she married the banker Bernard Gautier.

In July 1969, Gautier-van Berchem – at the age of 77 – undertook yet another mission for the ICRC, when she and an ICRC delegate visited three Palestinians who were detained in a Zürich prison for the El Al Flight 432 attack. The Israeli plane was attacked by four members of the militant organization Popular Front for the Liberation of Palestine, while it was preparing for takeoff at the Zurich International Airport in Kloten. One crew member and one assailant were killed, while several Israelis were severely injured.

== Death ==
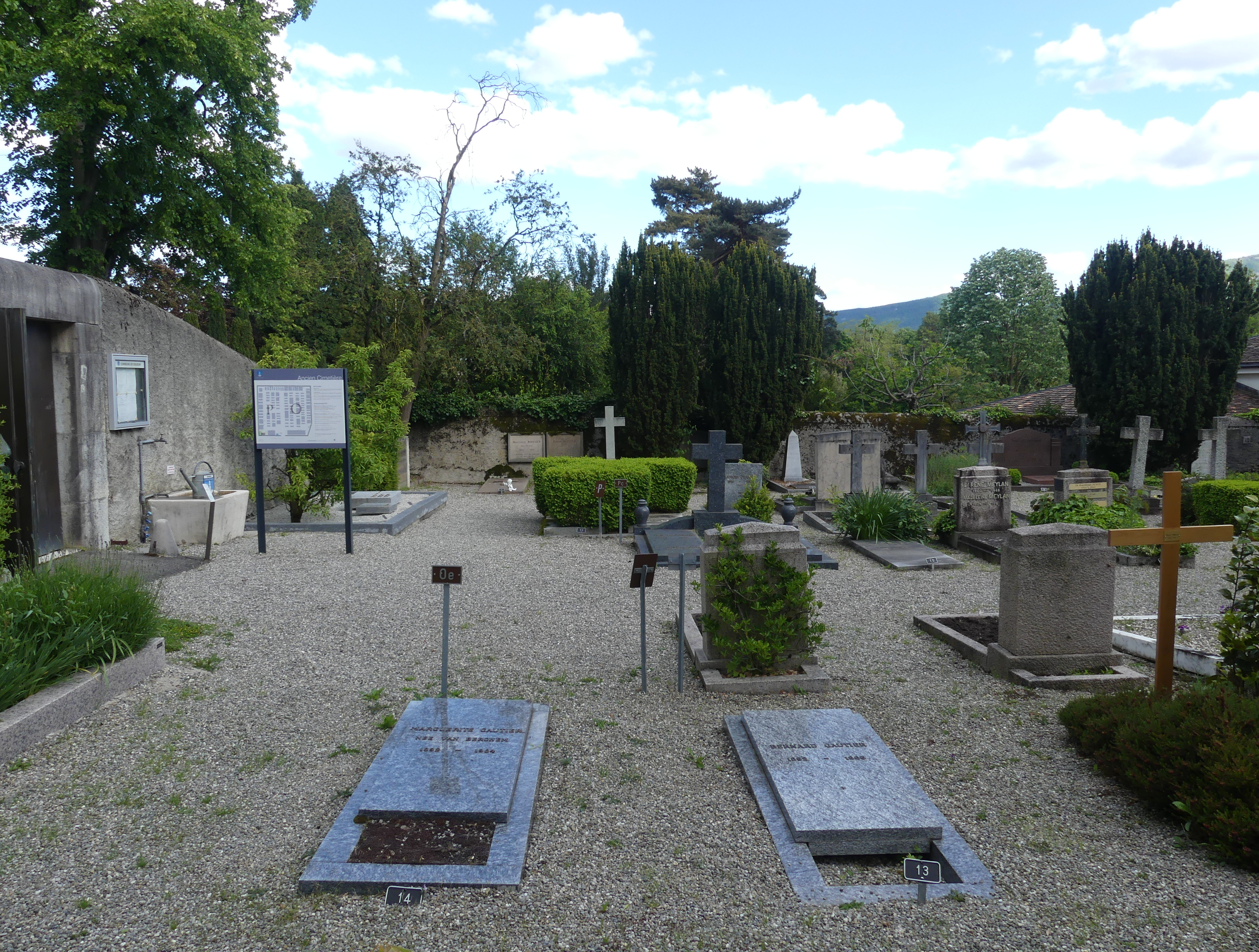
The graves of Gautier-van Berchem (left) and her husband with the grave of her father in the background, marked by a white obelisk

Gautier-van Berchem died on 23 January 1984 at the age of 91. Upon her death, the former vice-president of the ICRC Jean Pictet, wrote in an obituary which was published by the Journal de Genève, which said:

"A native of Geneva, she admirably embodied this ‹Geneva spirit›, thoughtful and reserved, willingly rebellious and caustic, but also generous and capable of igniting good causes. She was the heiress to this scientific and humanist tradition, which, aristocratic or popular, is the common heritage of all Genevans."

Her husband, Bernard Gautier, died in 1984 also. Their graves are at the Ancien Cimetière de Cologny, where her father is buried as well.

== Legacy ==
The Villa Saladin-van Berchem

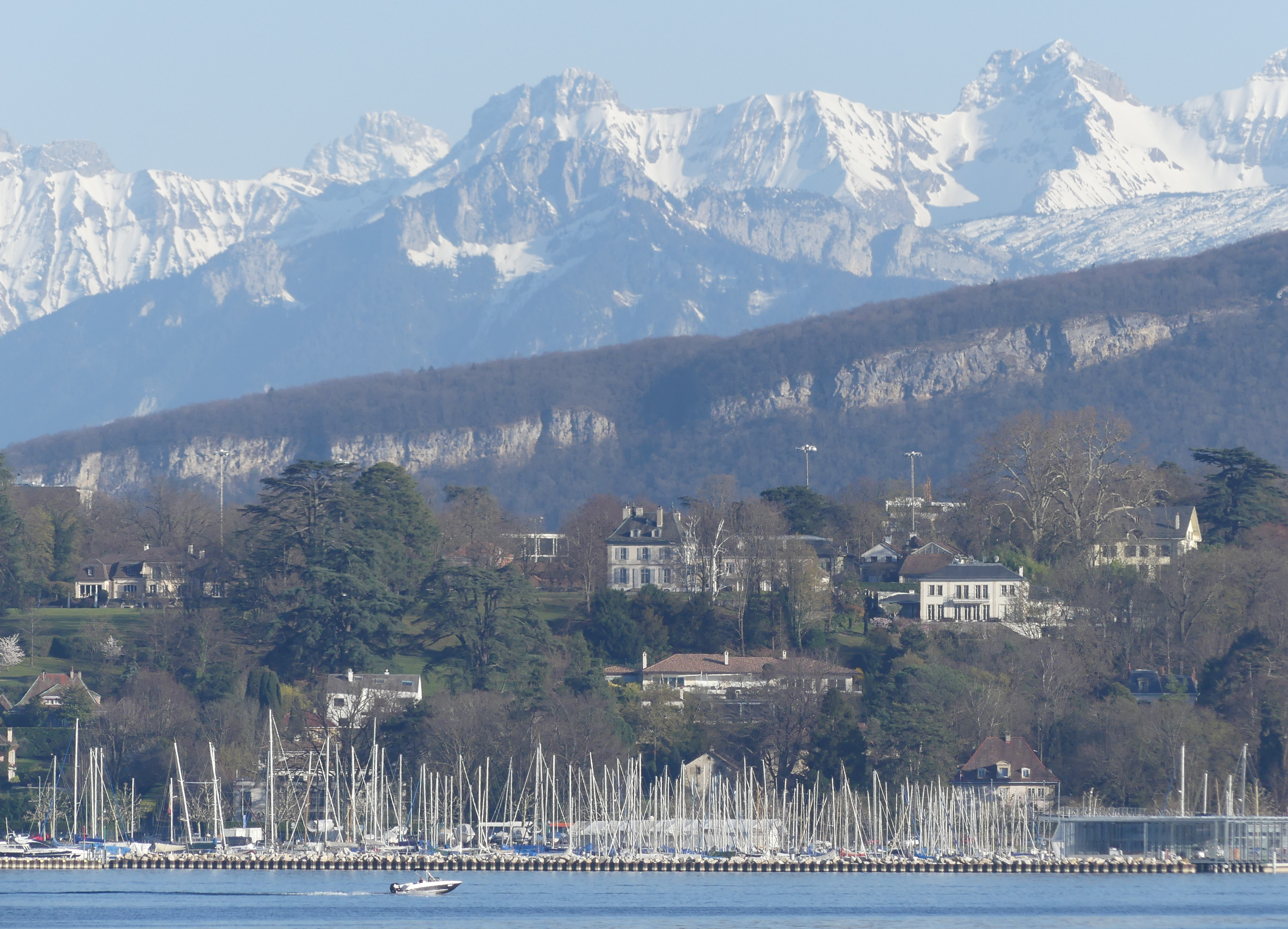
West side (centre)

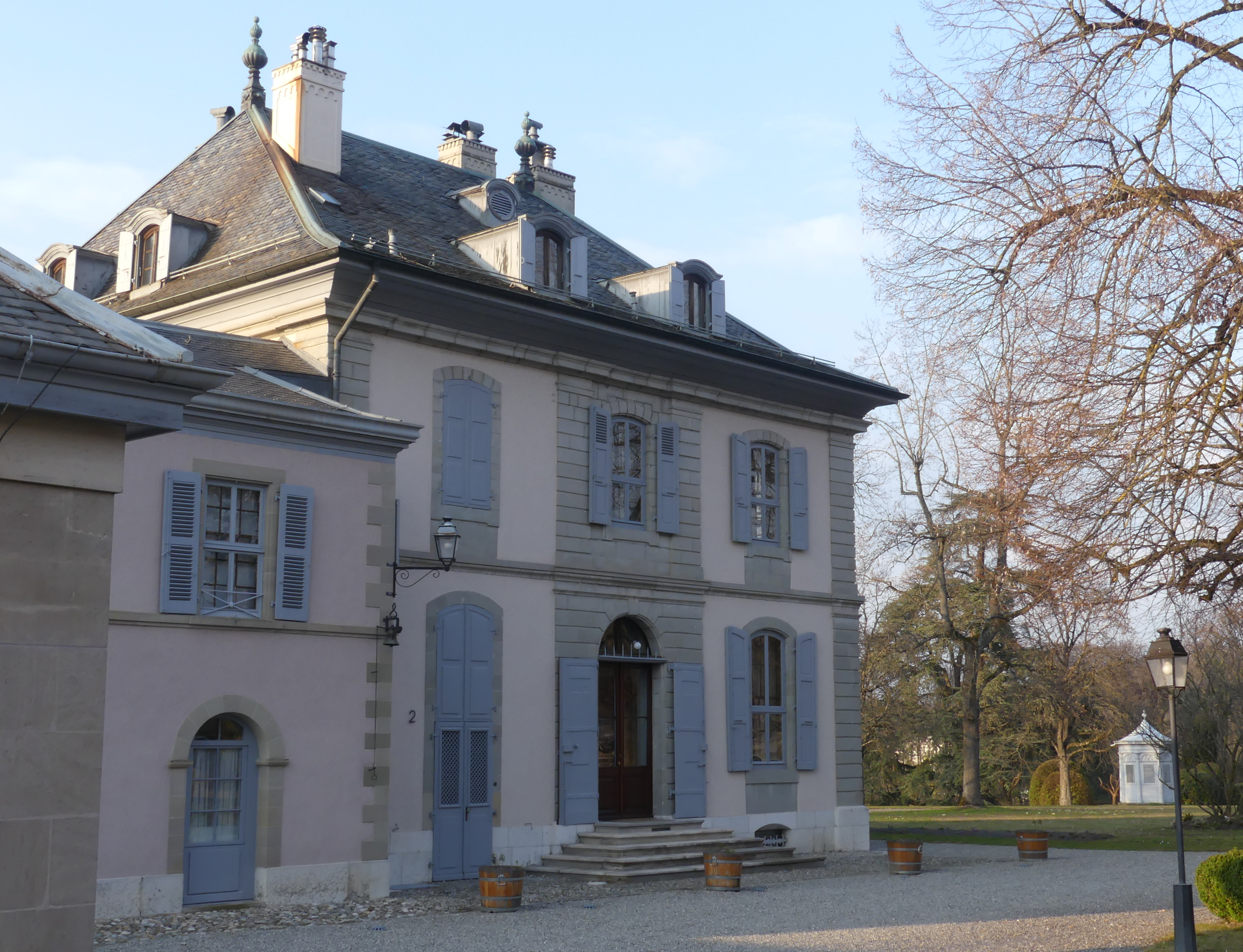
East side

In 1973, Gautier-van Berchem, who did not have immediate heirs of her own, donated the Villa Saladin-van Berchem to the Swiss Confederation. Though it had been the property of the Saladin family for seven generations, Gautier-van Berchem had not inherited it from that part of her family, but purchased it in 1955. Since she did not want the estate, which was built in 1715 at the Plateau de Frontenex in Cologny overlooking Lake Geneva, to fall into foreign hands, she gave it to the government under the condition that the state of the architectural ensemble would stay inalienable. The villa has served since then as the residence of the permanent representative of Switzerland to the United Nations Office at Geneva.

== Selected works ==
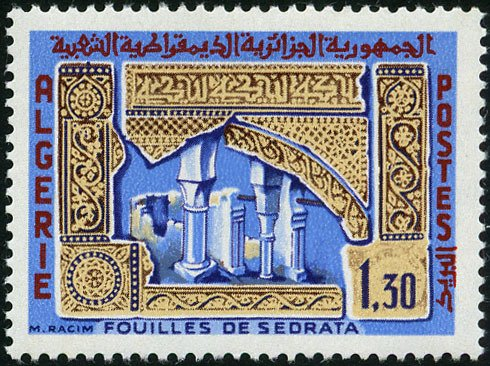
Algerian stamp from 1967 honouring the Sedrata excavations

- Mosaïques Chrétiennes du IVme au Xme Siècles, with Etienne Clouzot. Geneva 1924
- The Mosaics of the Dome of the Rock at Jerusalem and of the Great Mosque at Damascus. In: Keppel Archibald Cameron Creswell: Early Muslim Architecture Vol. 1. Oxford 1932, pp. 152–252
- Les Sections auxiliaires du Comité international de la Croix-Rouge, Geneva 1947
- Deux campagnes de fouilles à Sedrata en Algérie. In: Comptes rendus des séances de l’Académie des Inscriptions et Belles-Lettres 1952, pp. 242–246
- Sedrata. Un chapitre nouveau de l'histoire de l'art Musulman. Campagnes de 1951 et 1952, in: Ars Orientalis, Vol. 1 (1954), pp. 157–172
- Sedrata et les anciennes villes berbères du Sahara dans les récits des explorateurs du XIXème siècle, in: Bulletin de l’Institut Français d’Archéologie Orientale, Vol. 59 (1960), pp. 289–308
- Palmettes, rosaces et bordures dans les décors de Sedrata, L.A. Mayer Memorial Volume (1895–1959), in: Eretz Israël: Archæological, Historical and Geographical Studies, Vol. 7 (1964), pp. 6–16.
- Le palais de Sedrata dans le désert saharien. In: Studies in Islamic Art and Architecture, in honour of Professor K.A.C. Creswell. Cairo 1965, pp. 8–29
- Anciens décors de mosaïques de la salle de prière dans la Mosquée des Omayyades à Damas. In: Mélange offerts à M. Maurice Dunand (= Mélanges de l’Université Saint-Joseph 46). Beirut 1970, pp. 287–304
- La Jérusalem musulmane dans l'œuvre de Max van Berchem, with Solange Ory, Lausanne 1978
- Muslim Jerusalem In The Work Of Max van Berchem, with Solange Ory, Fondation Max van Berchem, Geneva 1982
