= Turrettini family =

Coat of arms of the Turrettini family

The Turrettini family (sometimes written as Turrettin and Turretin) is a family of Italian origin based in Geneva, Switzerland that distinguished itself in politics, diplomacy, trade, banking, theology, academia and industry.

== History ==
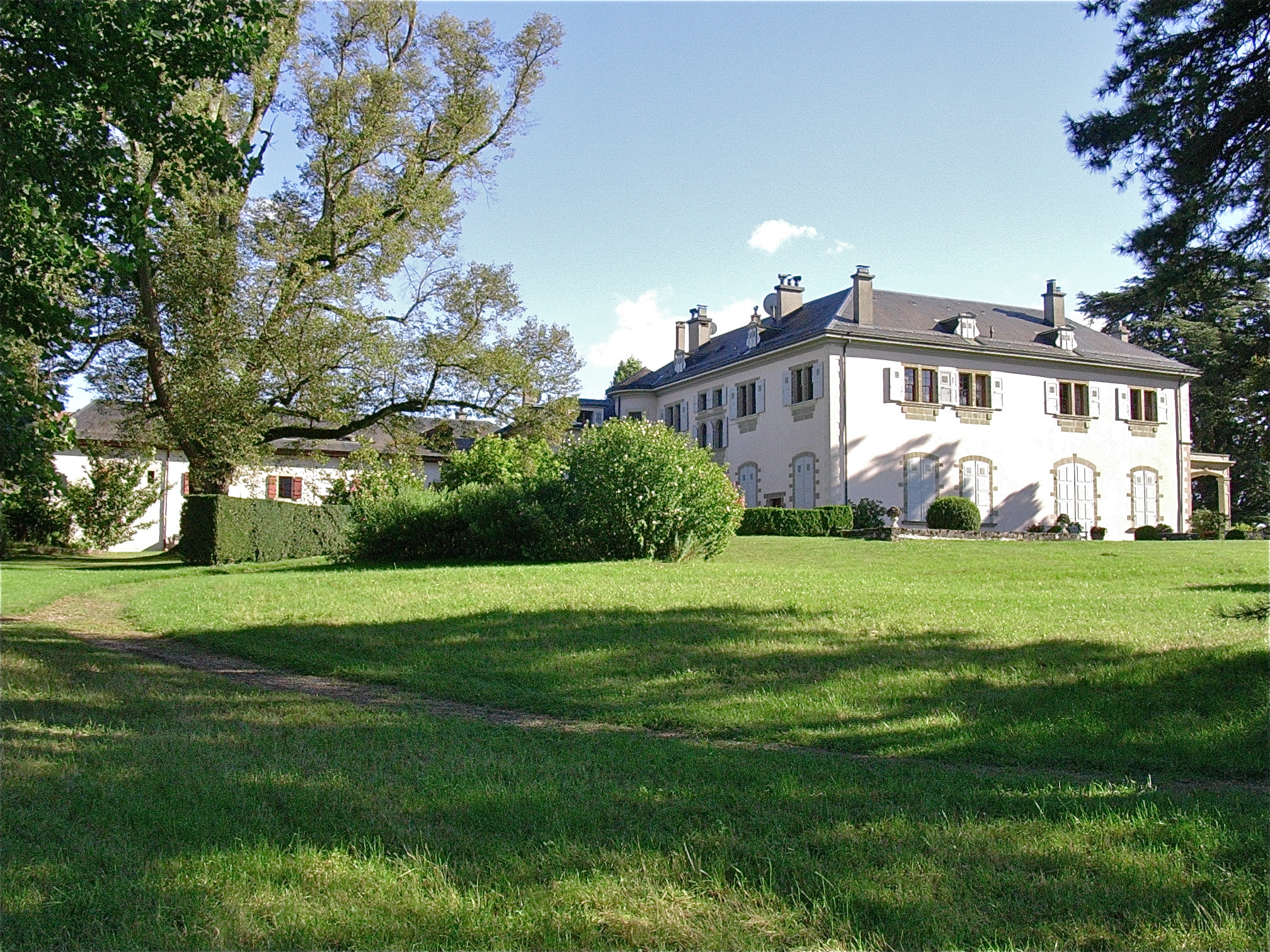
The Château des Bois in Satigny, in the canton of Geneva, built by Jean Turrettini in 1631.

The Turrettini family hails from the Italian city of Lucca, then the capital of the Republic of Lucca. They are first mentioned in 1280 with Bernardo, from Nozzano, a frazione of Lucca. In the 15th and 16th centuries, the Turrettini were among the aristocratic families who governed the city, their ancestry including bankers, notaries, silk weavers, and merchants. The family's nobility was recognized on April 10, 1582 by Emperor Rudolf II.

Francesco Turrettini (later known as François Turrettini) converted to Protestantism, fled Lucca and settled in Calvinist Geneva in 1592, where he was admitted into the bourgeoisie in 1627. His son, Jean, built the Château de Turrettin (now the Château des Bois) on his father's land in 1631. Through marriage, the Turrettini allied themselves with the patrician families of the Republic of Geneva, including those of fellow Italian Protestant refugees.

Francesco's sons founded two branches: the first descended from Bénédict, whose son François and grandson Jean-Alphonse were distinguished theologians and professors at the Academy of Geneva. It included by its third generation a syndic of Geneva, Horace-Bénédict (1651-1728), and died out in 1844. The second branch, still extant, descends from Jean, who obtained letters patent from King Louis XIV in 1653 recognizing his family's nobility, thus allowing them to enjoy the same privileges as the nobility of France. On May 12, 1656, these were registered at Dijon. Later, these were confirmed at Versailles on May 29, 1713. Finally, they were reconfirmed by King Louis XVI for Horace Jean Turrettini.

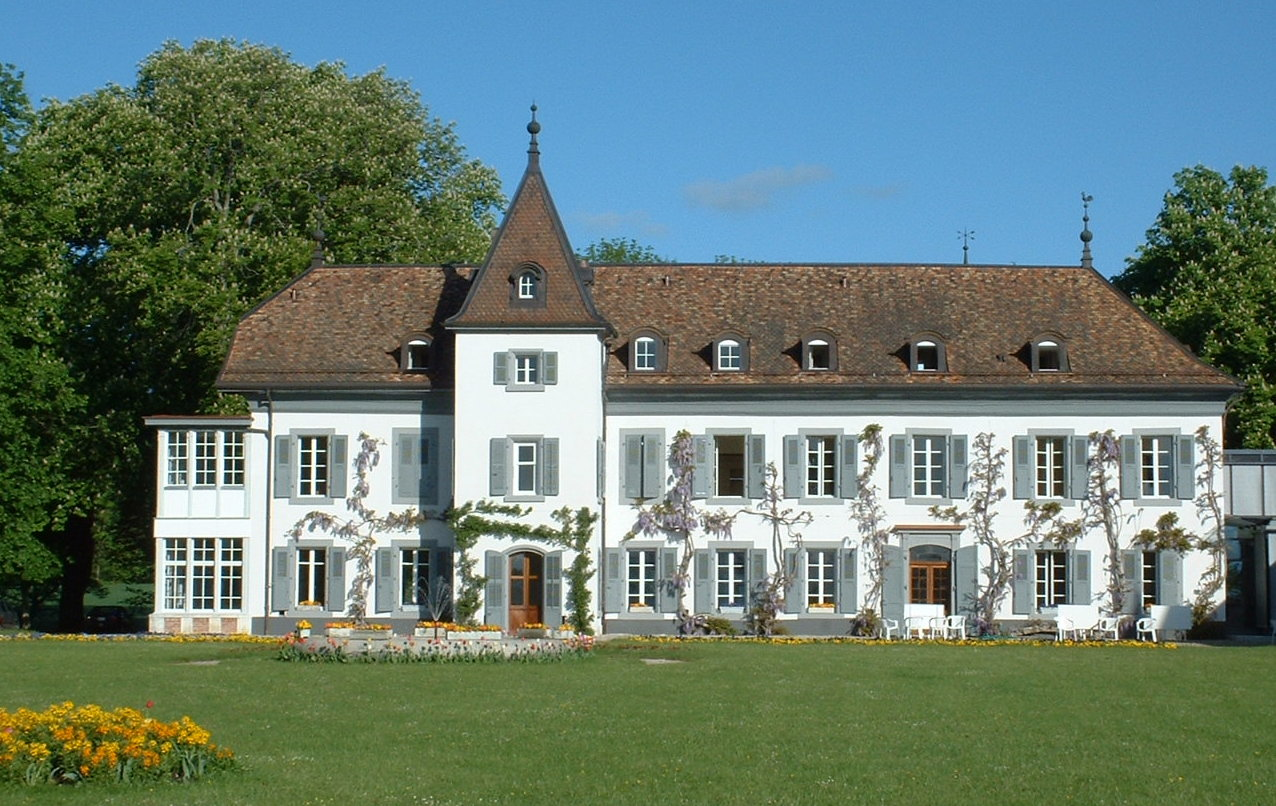
The Château de Bossey in Bogis-Bossey, constructed by the Turrettini family in 1722.

Jean inherited the property and titles of his cousin Mario, who remained in Italy. This branch of the Turrettini family provided several statesmen for the Republic, who made a decisive contribution to the industrial development of Geneva; it also distinguished itself in the academic world with the theologian Michel (1646-1721) and the sinologist François (1845-1908).

Starting with Jean Turrettini, four generations of Turrettinis were Lords of Bossey, a territory in the modern day Bogis-Bossey of Switzerland. The Turrettinis built the Château de Bossey in 1722, which was later sold to Germaine de Staël in 1809.

== Notable members ==
- Francesco Turrettini (1547–1628), silk merchant
- Bénédict Turrettini (1588–1631), theologian
- François Turrettini (1623–1687), theologian
- Jean-Alphonse Turrettini (1671–1737), theologian
- Théodore Turrettini (1845–1916), engineer and politician
- François Turrettini (1845–1908), sinologist
- Maurice Turrettini (1878–1932), architect
- Andrienne de Turrettini (1912–2006), painter (article in French)
- Jean Jacques Turrettini (1779–1858), painter (article in German)
- Auguste-Emmanuel Turrettini (1818–1881), philologist and politician (article in German)
