= Francesco Turrettini =

Italian silk merchant and banker

- Born: May 5, 1547; Lucca, Italy
- Died: March 13, 1628 (aged 80); Geneva, Switzerland
- Occupations: Silk merchant and banker
- Known for: Key player in the Genevan silk industry
- Spouse: Camilla Burlamacchi (m. 1587)
- Children: 10+

Francesco Turrettini (May 5, 1547 – March 13, 1628) was an influential Italian silk merchant and banker. Originally from Lucca, he became a prominent figure in the Protestant Reformation and a key player in the Genevan silk industry. He is best known for founding the Grande Boutique, a commercial consortium that dominated European silk trade in the late 16th and early 17th centuries.

== Early life and conversion ==
Francesco was born in Lucca to Regolo Turrettini and Chiara Franciotti. He had two brothers, Federigo and Paolo, and two sisters, Lucrezia and Camilla. His family was active in local governance; his father served several terms as gonfaloniere, a high-ranking civic office.

In 1566, at age 19, Turrettini converted to the Reformed faith following extensive theological discussions with family and peers. He remained in Lucca for nearly a decade after his conversion, managing the Micheli-Arnolfini silk company before establishing his own successful silk enterprise. Despite the challenges of European trade in the period, he achieved notable success, later claiming that no one in Lucca could rival him in the silk trade at the time.

The arrival of Giovanni Battista Castelli, bishop of Rimini and papal apostolic visitor sent by Pope Gregory XIII, in Lucca prompted Turrettini to leave on October 17, 1575, to avoid arrest. After a brief stop in Lyon with his maternal uncles, the Franciotti, he settled in the city-state of Geneva, joining the Italian Reformed Church on December 19, 1575.

He initially partnered with fellow Lucchesi émigrés Carlo and Pompeo Diodati, but soon relocated to Antwerp, where he acted as a factor for several Italian firms based in Geneva. He maintained connections with the French Reformed Church and reportedly had friendly relations with the Antwerp magistrate Philippe de Marnix de Sainte-Aldegonde, although records are inconclusive. In 1585, he left Antwerp shortly before the arrival of Spanish troops under Alessandro Farnese.

== Later career and Grande Boutique ==
Passing through Frankfurt and Basel, where local authorities blocked his attempt to establish a silk manufacturing enterprise, Turrettini settled in Zurich. There, in partnership with David and Heinrich Werdmüller, he established a company producing woolen fabrics and silk remnants, operating between 1587 and 1592.

On July 9, 1587, he married Camilla Burlamacchi, daughter of Michele Burlamacchi. She played an active role in his business, managing operations during Turrettini’s frequent absences, which could last up to two months per year. The couple had at least ten children.

In 1592, Turrettini permanently returned to Geneva, where he founded the Grande Boutique, a consortium of silk merchants and financiers, which became one of the most influential commercial networks of its era. Between 1594 and 1627, the consortium underwent nine renewals, with capital growing from 18,000 to 100,000 scudi, and generated significant profits for its investors.

Turrettini leveraged both his mercantile experience in Lucca and his extensive network of family and acquaintances to expand operations. He innovated in silk manufacturing by introducing lower-cost production and sourcing Chinese silks through the Netherlands before they were widely known in Italy. He also became a prominent banker, in partnership with Carlo Diodati, and frequently mediated financial and commercial transactions between Geneva and major European trading centers.

== Personal life and legacy ==
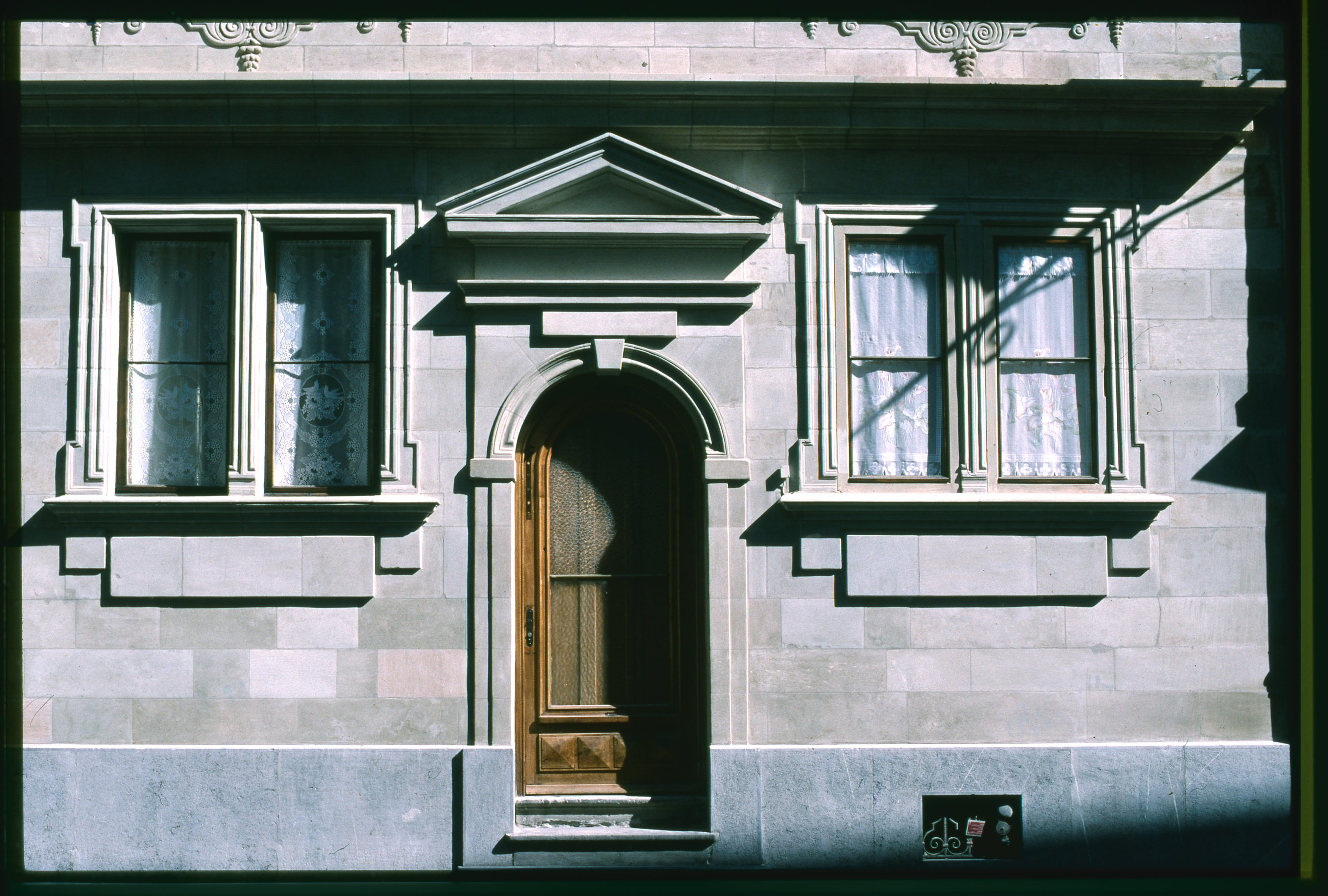
The outside of the Maison Turrettini, the building constructed by Francesco Turrettini in Geneva.

Turrettini and his wife adhered to the austere lifestyle typical of Genevan Calvinists, yet they also continued the Lucchese tradition of visiting thermal baths, frequenting those at Baden.

He died in Geneva on March 13, 1628, at his residence, Maison Turrettini, completed around 1616. In 1627, shortly before his death, he and his sons Bénédict and Jean were granted Genevan citizenship in recognition of their contributions. His estate included charitable legacies and landed properties, such as the Château des Bois at Satigny.

His eldest son, Bénédict Turrettini, born in Zurich in 1588, pursued a theological career, becoming a professor at the Geneva Academy and serving in diplomatic missions. Turrettini was the grandfather of renowned theologian Francis Turretin.
