= François Turrettini (Sinologist) =

François Auguste Turrettini (1845 — 1908) was a Swiss Sinologist and publisher, active in the City of Geneva in the late 19th century. He studed in Geneva in 1865–66, then later at the École des langues orientales in Paris. Later, he studied at the Collège de France underneath Stanislas Julien.

In 1871, he founded the publishing firm "L'Atsumegusa" in Geneva that, for the first time in Europe, printed East Asian texts in Chinese characters. His research and publishing projects relied on the assistance of Tschin Ta-Ni, a Chinese typesetter, who was the first Chinese person to obtain citizenship in the City and Republic of Geneva.

Turrettini was a descendant of an elite merchant family who fled to Geneva after the Protestant Reformation in Italy, the Turrettini.

== List of publications ==
The publications of Turrettini's publishing house "Atsumegusa" included:

- Turrettini, François. "Heike Monogatari", vol. 1 (1871), in: Turrettini, François (ed.): Edition de l'Atsume Gusa, pour servir à la connaissance de l'Extrême-Orient, 8 vols., Genève: H. Georg, 1871–81.
- Turrettini, François. "Heike Monogatari", vol. 2 (1871?), in: Turrettini, François (ed.): Edition de l'Atsume Gusa, pour servira à la connaissance de l'Extrême-Orient, 8 vols., Genève: H. Georg, 1871–81.
- Turrettini, François. Tami no nigivai. Contes moraux. Texte japonais et traduction. Genève: L'Atsume Gusa, 1871.
- Julien, Stanislas. Si-Siang-Ki, Genève: L'Atsume Gusa, 1872–1880.
- Turrettini, François. (ed.) Edition Ban-Zai-Sau, textes pour servir à la connaissance de l'Extrême-Orient. Genève: H. Georg, 5 vols, 1873–94.
- Turrettini, François. Avalokitesvara sutra, (traduction italienne de la version chinoise avec introduction et notes par Carlo Puini, transcription japonaise par François Turrettini), Genève: L'Atsume Gusa, (1873?)
- Turrettini, François. Kan-ing-pien, vol. 4, in: Turrettini, François (Hg.): Ban-zai-sau pour servir à la connaissance de l'extrême orient, Genève: H. Georg, 1873.
- Turrettini, François. Histoire des Taira, tirée du Nit-pon Gwai-si. Récits de l'histoire du Japon au XIIe siècle, trad. du chinois, Genève: H.Georg, 1874–75.
- Severini, Anselmo: Astrologia Giapponese, Genève: L'Atsume Gusa, 1874.
- Turrettini, François. Komats Et Sakitsi Ou: La Rencontre De Deux Nobles Coeurs Dans Une Pauvre Existence. Nouvelles Scènes De Ce Monde Périssable, Exposées Sur Six Feuilles De Paravent. Par Riutei Tanefiko. Genève, Paris, London: H. Georg, 1875.
- Turrettini, François. San-ze-king, les phrases de trois caractères en chinois, avec les versions japonaise, mandchoue et mongole suuvues de l'explication de tous leurs mots, Genève: H. Georg, 1876.
- Ma-Touan-Lin. L'ethnographie des peuples étrangers, traduit par le marquis d'Hervé-Saint-Denis, vol. 1, Genève: L'Atsume Gusa, 1876.
- Turrettini, François et A. C. Guriel (ed.). Les Archives de Genève. Inventaire des documents contenus dans les portefeuilles historiques et les registres des conseil[s] avec le texte inédit de diverses pièces de 1528 à 1541. Genève: H. Georg, 1877.
- Turrettini, François et Metchnikoff, Léon (ed.). L'Extrême Orient. Recueil e linguistique d'ethnographie et d'histoire. Genève: Atsume Gusa, 1877.
- Metchnikoff, Léon: L'Empire Japonais, Genève: L'Atsume Gusa, 1881.
- Ma-Touan-Lin. L'ethnographie des peuples étrangers, traduit par le marquis d'Hervé-Saint-Denis, vol. 2, Genève: L'Atsume Gusa, 1883.
- Turrettini, François. Kan Ying P'ien, Genève: Ban-zai-sau, 1889.
- Turrettini, François. San Tseu King, (date unknown).
- Laozi. Le livre des récompenses et des peines, avec commentaire et légendes. Ouvrage taoïste, texte chinois publié par François Turrettini, Genève: H. Georg, 1889.
- Turrettini, François: Le commentaire du San-Ze-King, le recueil des phrases de trois mots, Genève: H. Georg, 1892–94.
- Valenziani, Carlo. La mort d'Atu-Mori, Genève: L'Atsume Gusa, 1893.
- Valenziani, Carlo. Dai-hei-ki, Genève: L'Atsume Gusa, (date unknown).
