= Château de Crans =

Castle in Crans, Switzerland

Crans Castle
- Château de Crans
- Crans in Switzerland
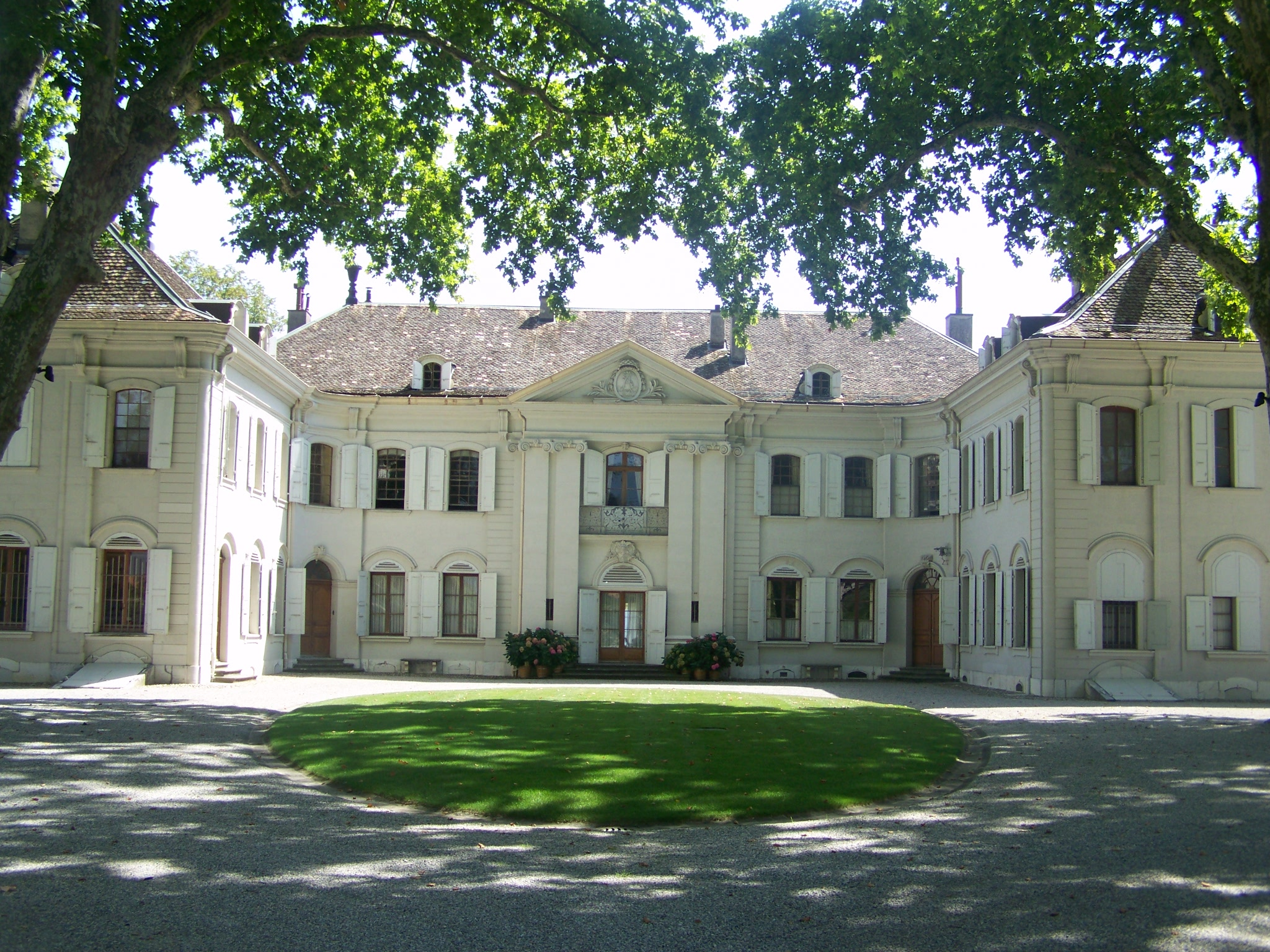
- Façade of Crans Castle, in 2011

Site information
- Owner: De Marignac family

Location
- Coordinates: 46°21′28″N 6°12′32″E

Site history
- Built: 1764
- Built by: Jean-Louis Bovet

Swiss Cultural Property of National Significance

Château de Crans is a manor house in the municipality of Crans in the Canton of Vaud in Switzerland. It is a Swiss heritage site of national significance.

== See also ==
- List of castles in Switzerland
- Château
