= Mytikas =

Mount Olympus
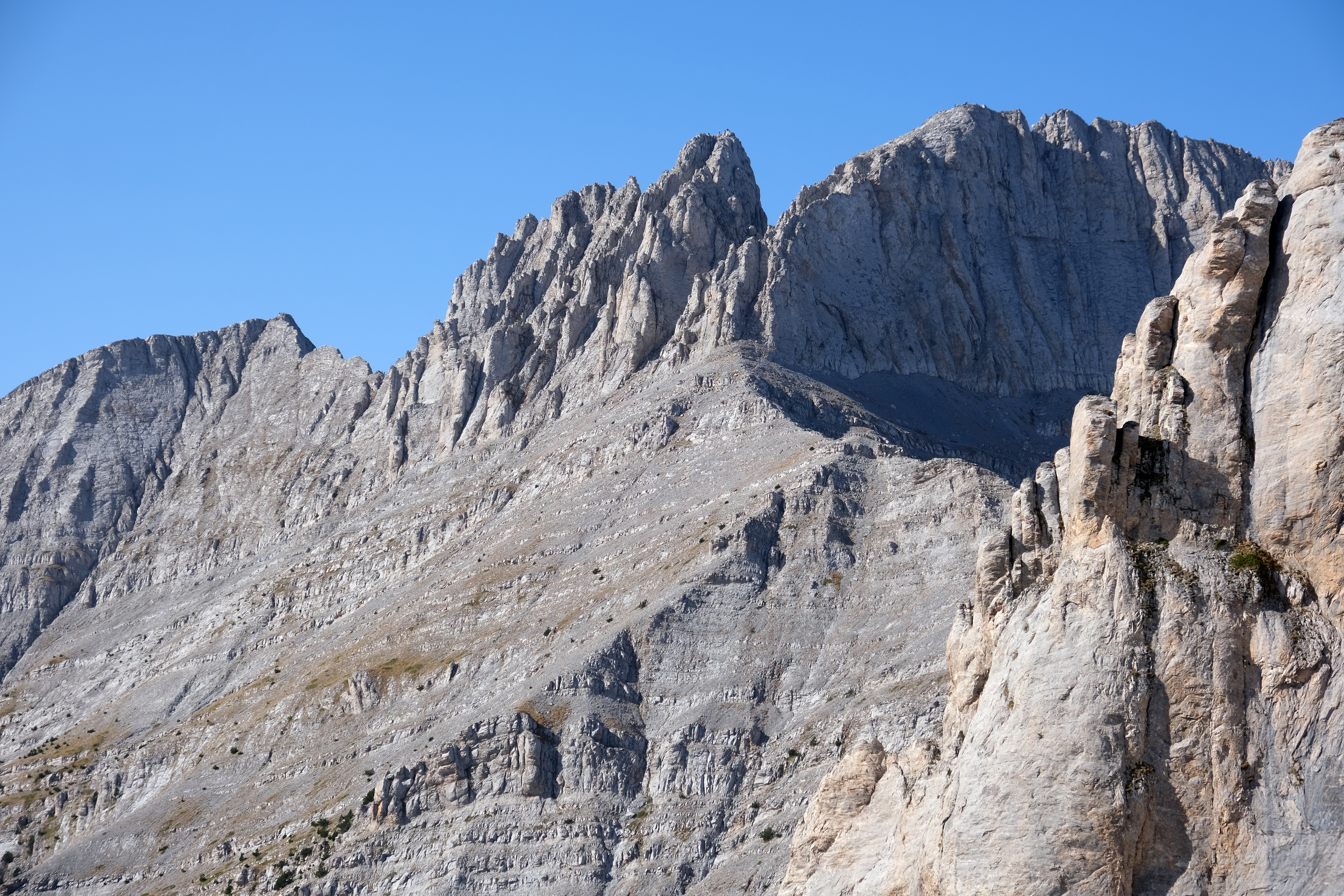
- Mount Olympus's peaks in daytime

Highest point
- Peak: Mytikas
- Elevation: 2,917.727 m (9,572.60 ft); Global Positioning System
- Prominence: 2,353 m (7,720 ft)
- Listing: Country high point Ultra
- Coordinates: 40°05′08″N 22°21′31″E

Geography
- Location within Greece
- Location: Greece
- Parent range: Thessaly and Macedonia, near the Thermaic Gulf

Climbing
- First ascent: By religious pilgrims or priests in Antiquity. First Modern Ascent: 2 August 1913; Christos Kakkalos, Frederic Boissonnas and Daniel Baud-Bovy

UNESCO World Heritage Site
- Official name: Wider Area of Mount Olympus
- Criteria: Mixed: vi, x
- Reference: 1719
- Inscription: 2026 (48th Session)

Mytikas is the highest peak of Mount Olympus and Greece, and the second-highest peak in the Balkans, after Musala in Bulgaria. Until recently, its elevation was given as 2,917.85 m, but more recent measurements, carried out through a collaboration between the International Hellenic University, the Aristotle University of Thessaloniki, and foreign institutions, have precisely determined its elevation to be 2,917.727 m.

Mytikas is a rounded summit and, together with Stefani, the second-highest peak, they form two sides of a triangle. This means that it is difficult to compare the heights of the two peaks visually.

As a mountaineering challenge, the summit is among the most difficult to climb in Greece. The Kakoskala section is one of the most dangerous parts of the ascent because of its steep gradient, the rugged terrain of the slope, and the overwhelming sensation caused by looking down at the vertical drop to the bottom of the slope. There are two trails leading to Mytikas: the Skala–Kakoskala route and the Zonaria–Loukí route. Both form part of the European long-distance path E4 and are therefore generally in good condition. Near the beginning of these routes are three of the four mountain refuges on Mount Olympus: two at an elevation of 2,650 m (the "G. Apostolidis" and "Ch. Kakkalos" refuges), and the "Spilios Agapitos" refuge at 2,100 m.

Mytikas is also known as the home of the gods, as it is the highest peak, while Stefani is known as the throne of Zeus. Although Mytikas is higher, climbing it is easier than ascending Stefani, which requires rock climbing experience.
