= Henriette Rath =

Swiss portrait painter (1772-1856)

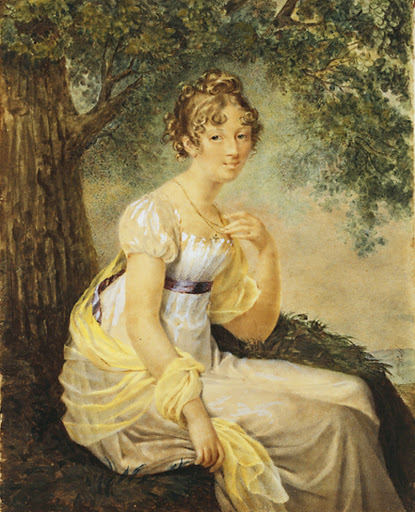
- Self-portrait, c. 1800
- Born: Jeanne Henriette Rath; 11 May 1772; Geneva, Republic of Geneva
- Died: 24 November 1856 (aged 84); Geneva, Switzerland
- Resting place: Cimetière des Rois

Henriette Rath (11 May 1772 – 24 November 1856) was a Swiss portrait artist who worked in enamel and oil painting. She was a pupil of Jean-Baptiste Isabey and the first woman to be made an honorary member of the Société des Arts. Rath worked and exhibited in Russia, France and Switzerland. Through an inheritance from her brother and the sale of several of her artworks, Rath and her sister founded the Musée Rath, a museum of art in Geneva, Switzerland, which remains open to the present day.

== Biography ==
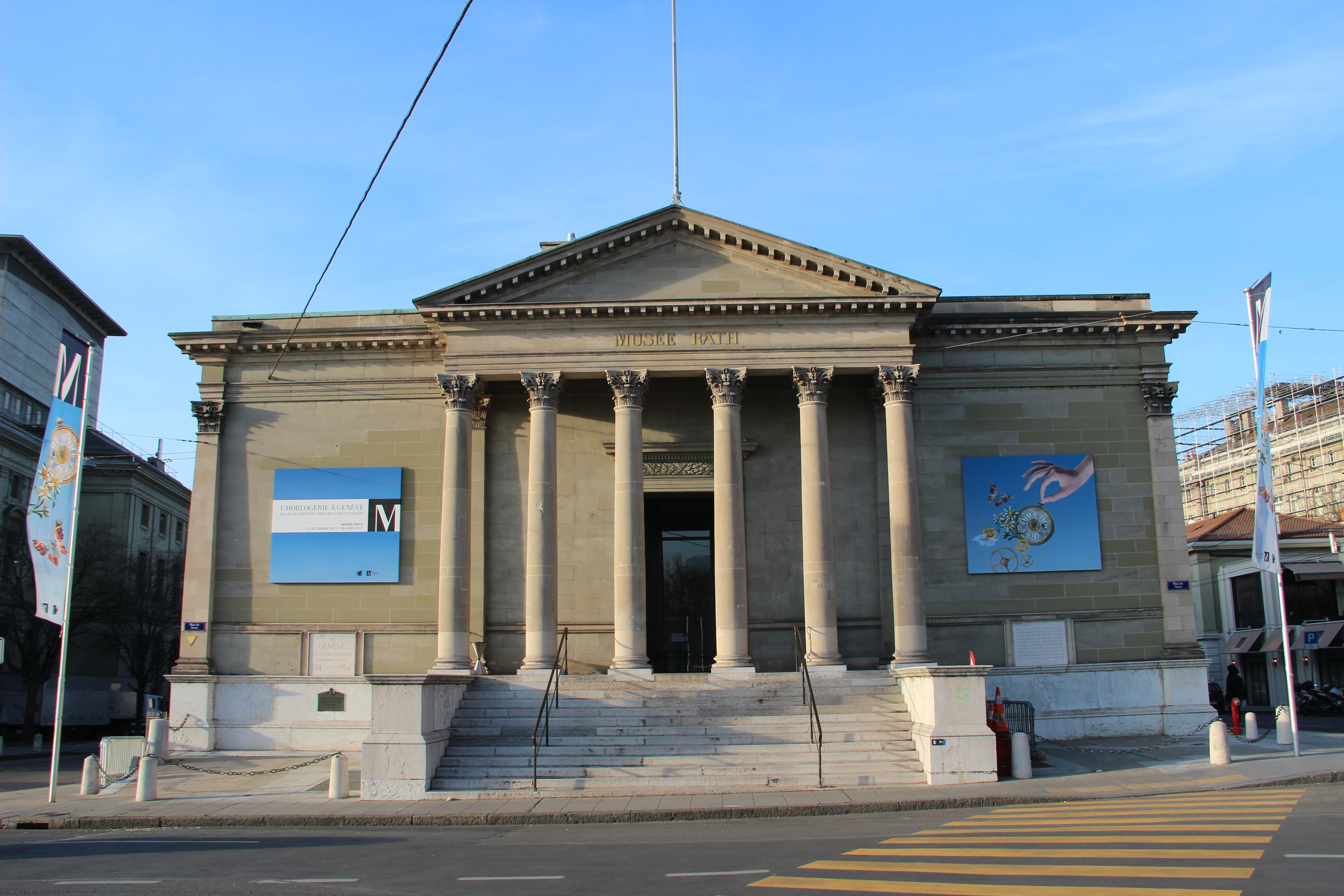
Entrance to the Musée Rath

Rath was born Jeanne Henriette Rath on 11 May 1772 in Geneva, Republic of Geneva. She was the daughter of Jean-Louis, a watch dealer, and Alexandrine Sarah Rolland. Her family was originally from Nîmes, France, who took refuge in Geneva fleeing from the persecution of Huguenots in 1705.

Rath had her first drawing lessons with Renée Sarasin-Bordier and in 1798 she began as a pupil in France with Jean-Baptiste Isabey. Isabey introduced Rath to the Russian imperial family, for whom she painted both copies and portraits. In 1799, she became a member of the committee for the Académie des jeunes filles der Société des Arts in Geneva. She taught young women to draw alongside Louise-Françoise Mussard, Élisabeth Terroux and Jeanne-Pernette Schenker-Massot, all of whom were miniatrists like Rath. In 1801, she was the first woman made an honorary member of the Société des Arts.

In 1810, she travelled to Russia with her brother, Simon. In 1813, she painted for Princess Juliane of Saxe-Coburg-Saalfeld in Bern. She then travelled on to Italy (1815) and Lyon.

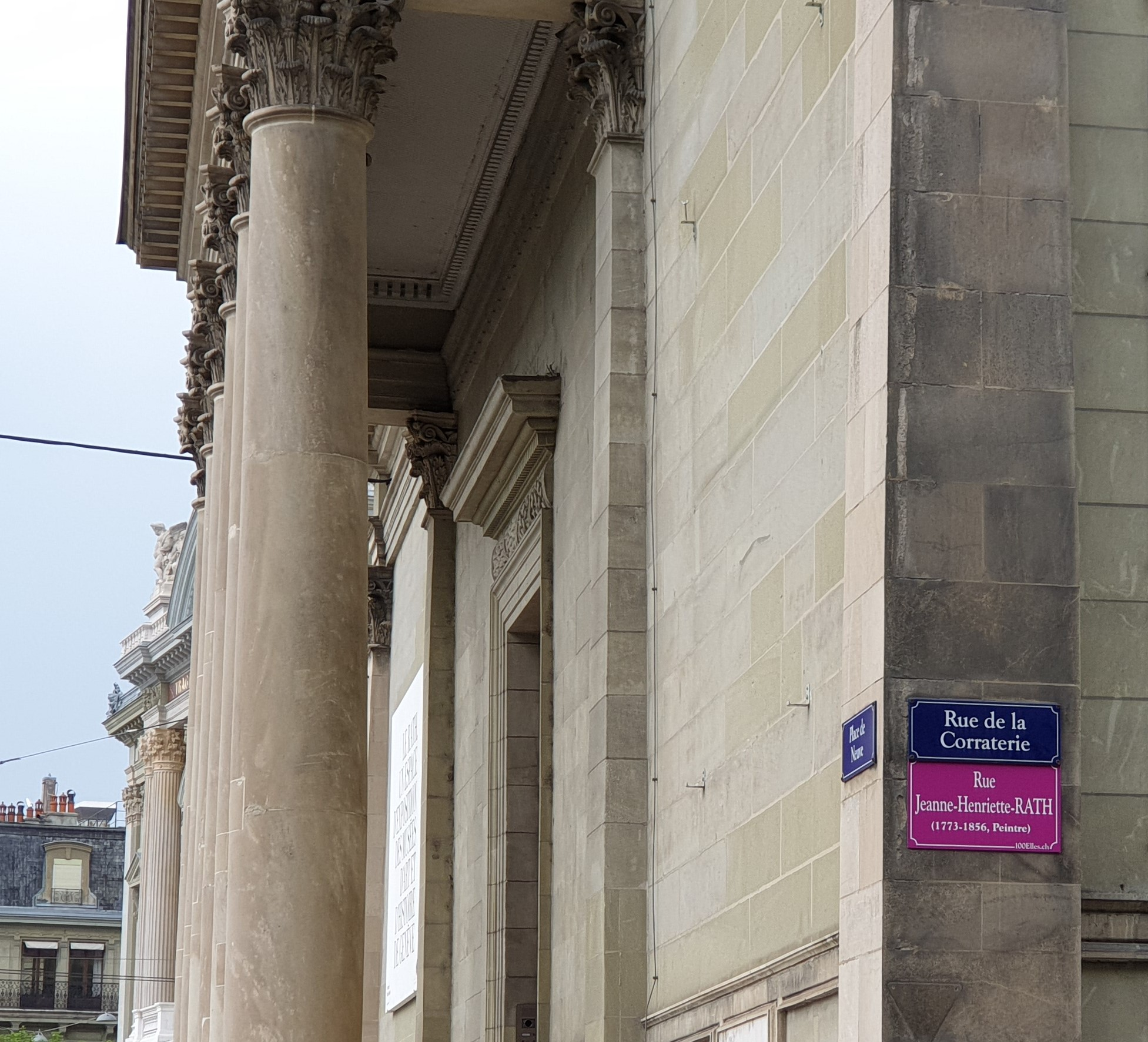
Rue Jeanne=Henriette=RATH

In 1826, she and her sister Jeanne Françoise founded the Musée Rath, using an inheritance from their brother Simon, who was a lieutenant general in the Russian service and died in 1819, and from the sale of several of Henriette Rath's paintings. In 1851, the Musée Rath came under the ownership of the City of Geneva against their wishes and has remained to the present day.

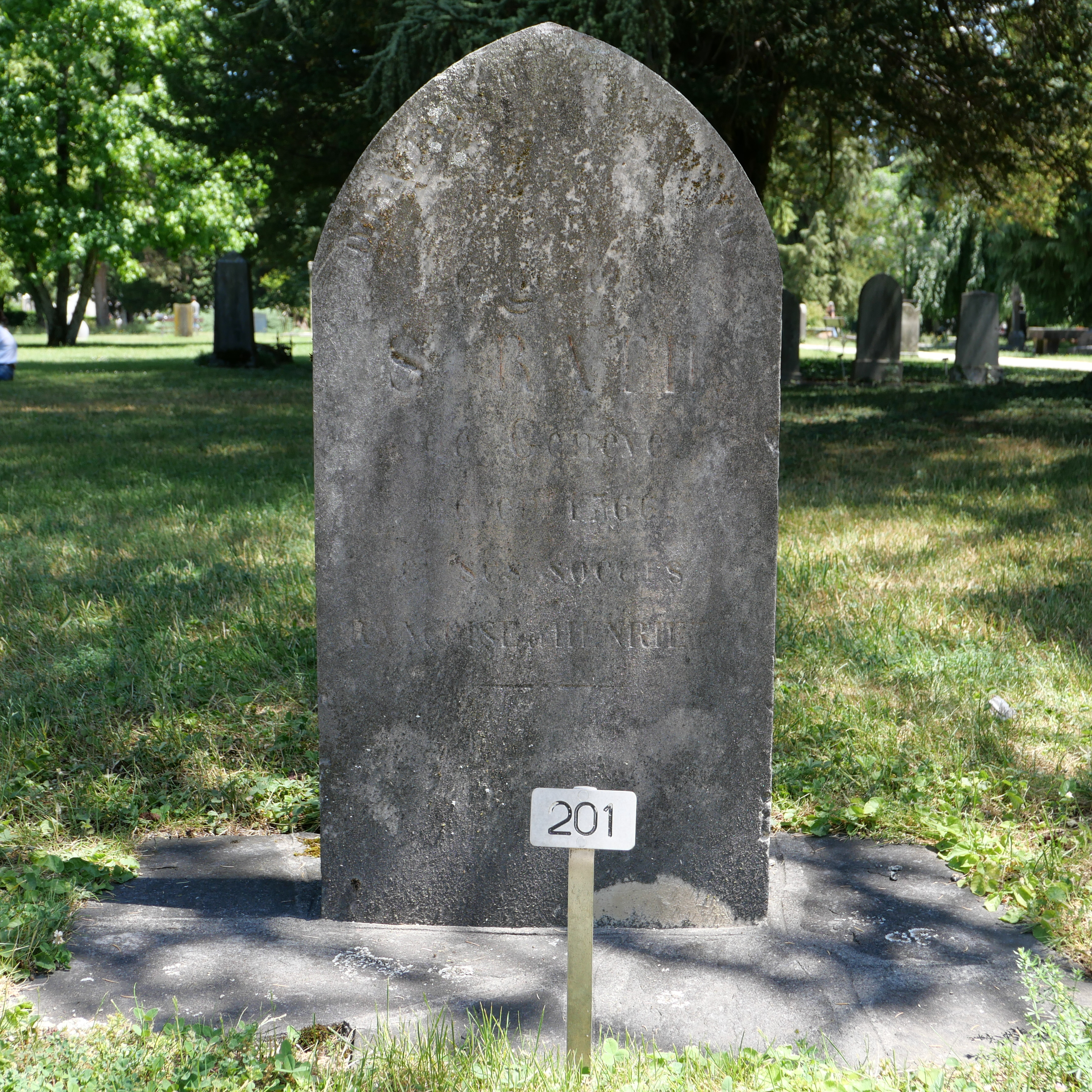
Grave of Simon and Henriette Rath in Cimetière des Rois, Geneva, Switzerland.

Rath died in Geneva on 24 November 1856. She is buried in Cimetière des Rois with her brother, Simon.

== Artworks ==
Rath was a portrait painter who produced enamels, miniatures and oil paintings. She exhibited at the Paris Salon in 1801, 1809 and 1810. From 1816 to 1851, she exhibited regularly in Société des Arts. She also exhibited in Geneva, Zurich and Bern. Several of her portraits were also reproduced as engravings.

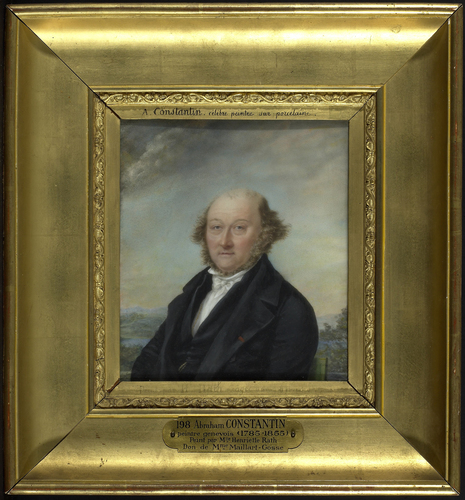
Abraham Constantin by Henriette Rath

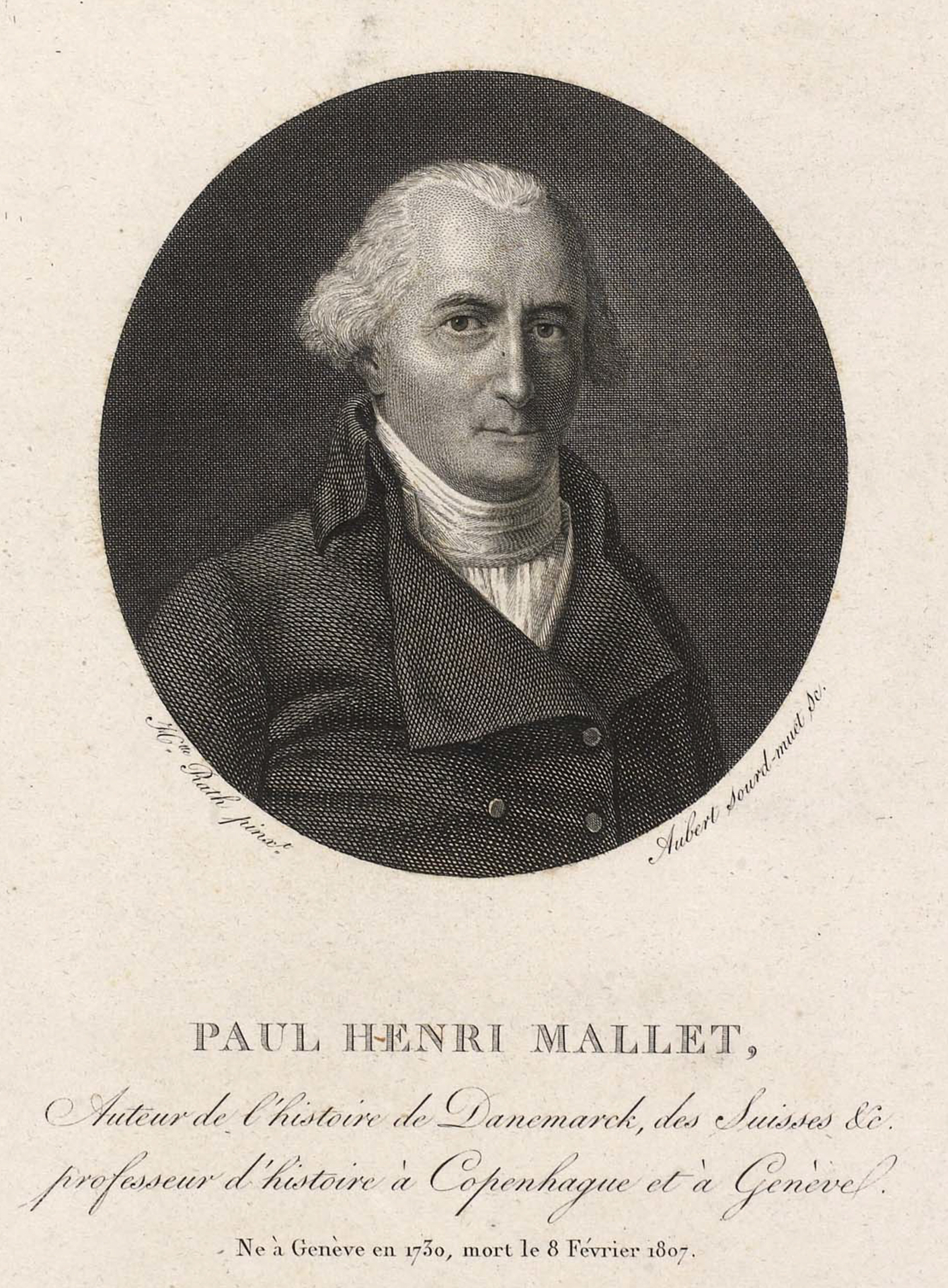
Engraving of Paul Henri Mallet by Henriette Rath

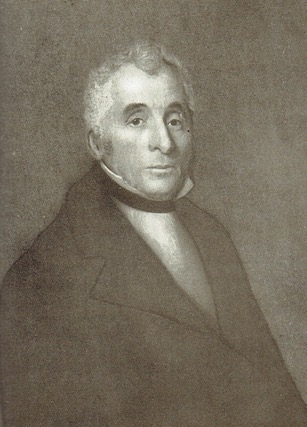
Paul Henri Mallet engraving based on portrait by Henriette Rath

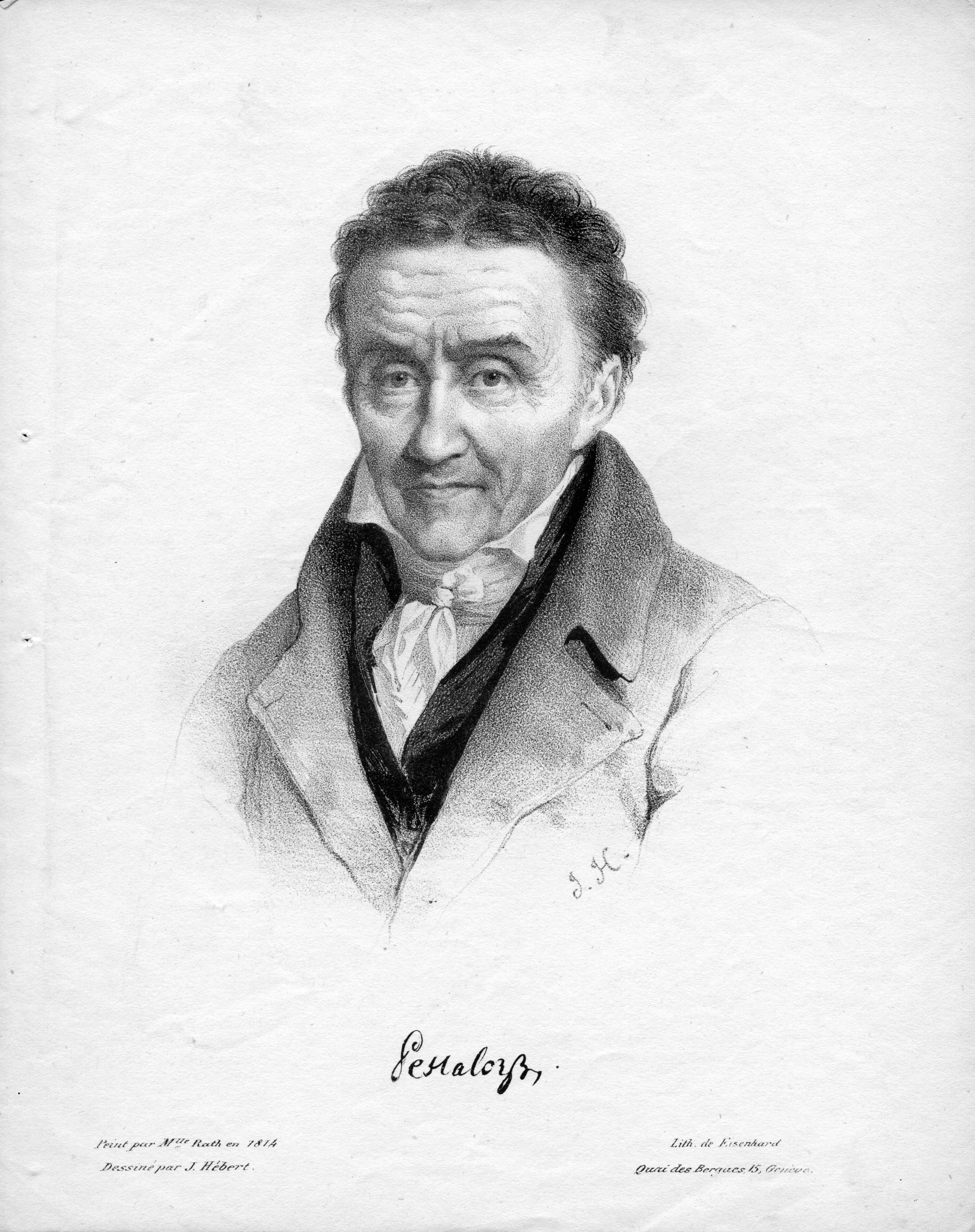
Johann Heinrich Pestalozzi (for Eisenhardt) after Jules Hébert, after Henriette Rath

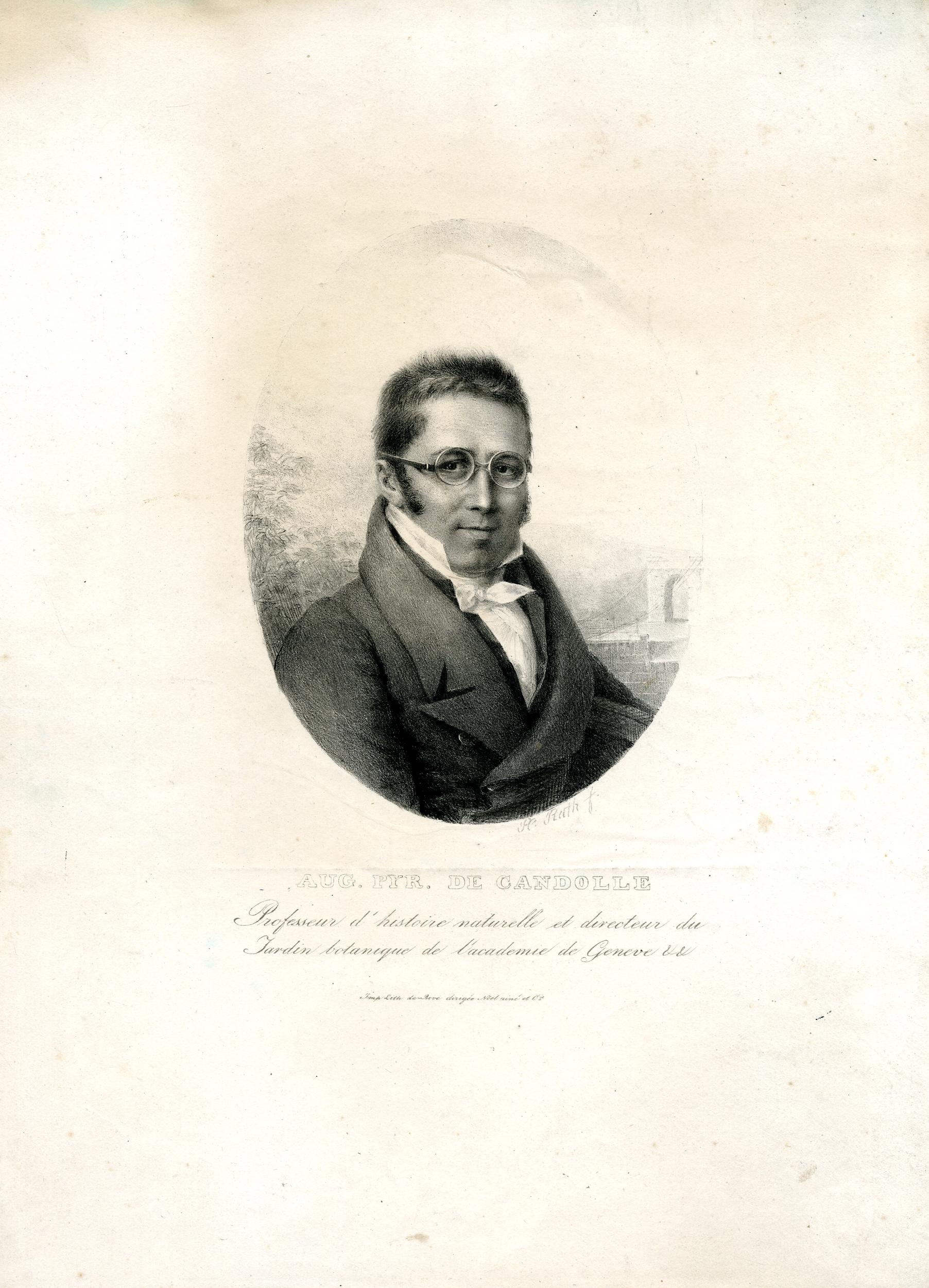
Portrait of Augustin-Pyramus de Candolle by Henriette Rath

== Legacy ==
In 2019, Rue de la Corraterie in Geneva was renamed Rue Jeanne-Henriette Rath as part of the 100Elles initiative.
