= Auguste Baud-Bovy =

Swiss painter (1848-1899)

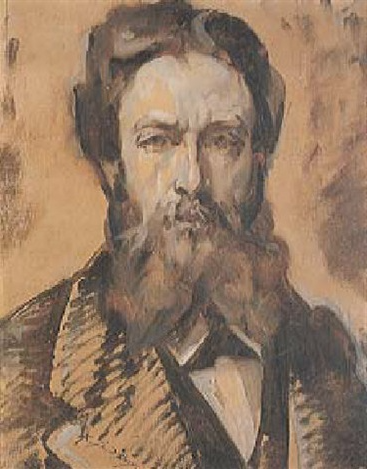
Self-portrait (1880)

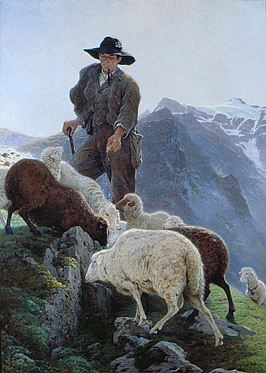
Distributing Salt to the Flock

Auguste Baud-Bovy (13 February 1848, Geneva – 3 June 1899, Davos) was a Swiss painter who specialized in landscapes, village scenes and shepherds.

== Biography ==
His father, Henri-Georges Baud, was the director of a well known jewelry store (Le Bijouterie Baud) which is still in business. In 1849, the Bovy and Balland families purchased the Château de Gruyères, restored it, and used it for a summer residence. The Bauds were among their regular guests and Auguste spent much of his childhood there. The Bovys were also Fourierists and their home, "La Colonie" served as the meeting place for many famous artists. Through one of the Bovys, he made friends with and began taking lessons from Barthélemy Menn.

In 1868, he married Zoé-Jeanne-Suzanne Bovy, who was an enamel painter. After that, he styled his name as "Baud-Bovy". By 1870, he was a professor at the Municipal Art School in Geneva. There, he made many friends among those who had come to Switzerland as a result of the Paris Commune, including Henri Rochefort, Joris-Karl Huysmans, Elisée Reclus and Gustave Courbet, whom he painted alongside at La Tour-de-Peilz. It was even rumored that he stole his father's passport to help Courbet enter Switzerland.

He and Zoé had two sons, André-Valentin (1875–1903), who also became a painter, and Daniel, a writer and art historian who served as the Conservator at the Musée Rath, Director of the École des Beaux-Arts de Genève and President of the Eidgenössische Kunstkommission. Daniel was, in turn, father of the musician Samuel Baud-Bovy.

Feeling overwhelmed, Baud-Bovy abandoned teaching in 1880 and took a trip to Spain. He decided to move his family to Paris in 1882, but was only there for a few years when he read a book on the Swiss countryside and was inspired to visit the small village of Aeschi. In 1888, he relocated there.

In 1891, together with Eugène Burnand and François Furet (1842–1919), he created part of a panorama (now lost) of the Bernese Alps that was shown at the Columbian World Exposition in 1893. That same year, thanks to a petition by Puvis de Chavannes, Auguste Rodin and others, he was awarded the French Legion of Honor. In 1897, he had a major exhibition at the Galerie Durand-Ruel in Paris.

In his final years, he suffered from tuberculosis. He stayed at Antibes in 1898, seeking a cure, then went to live with André-Valentin in Davos, where he died in 1899.
