= Christos Kakkalos =

Greek mountain climber and guide (1882-1976)

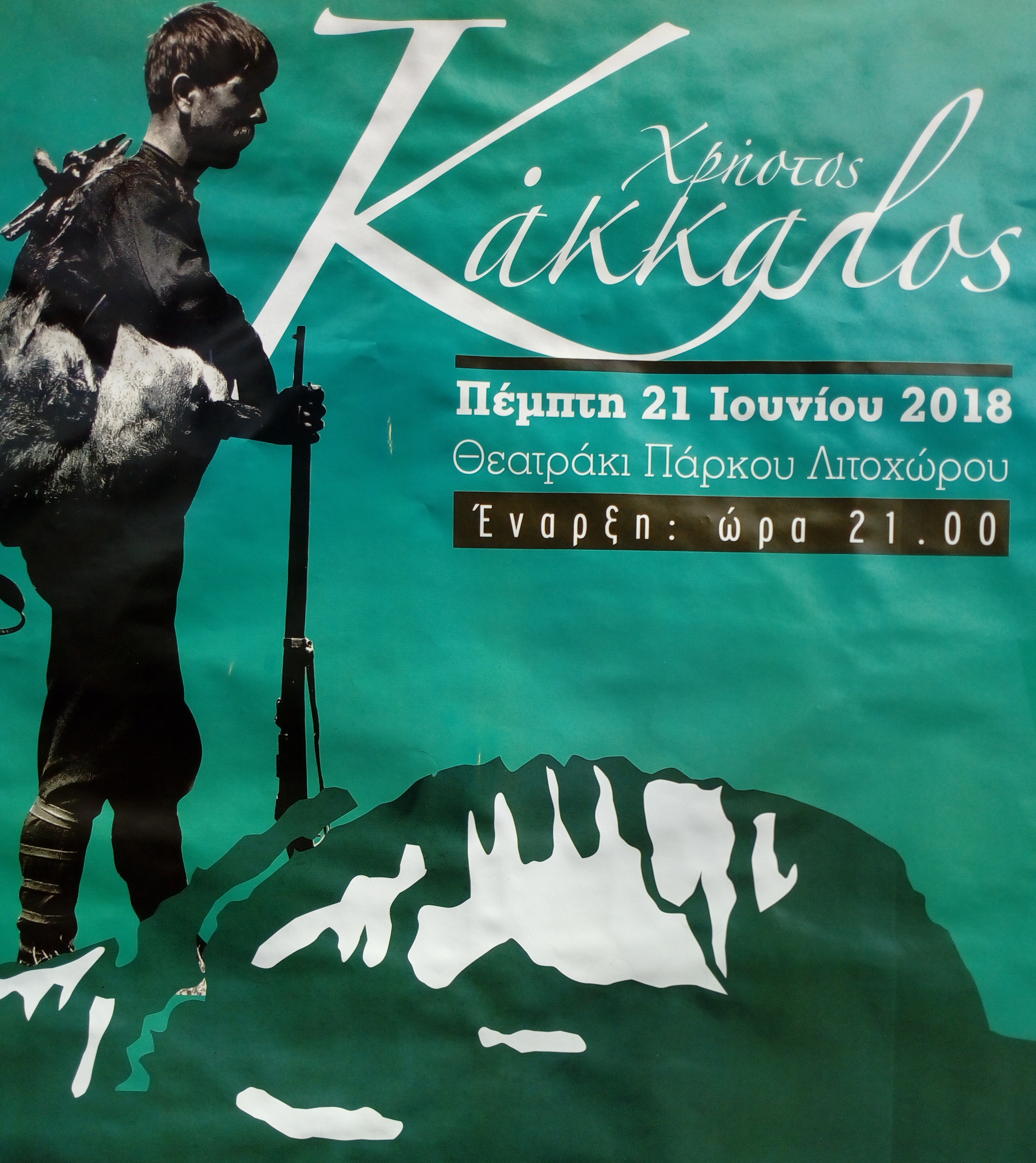
Christos Kakkalos

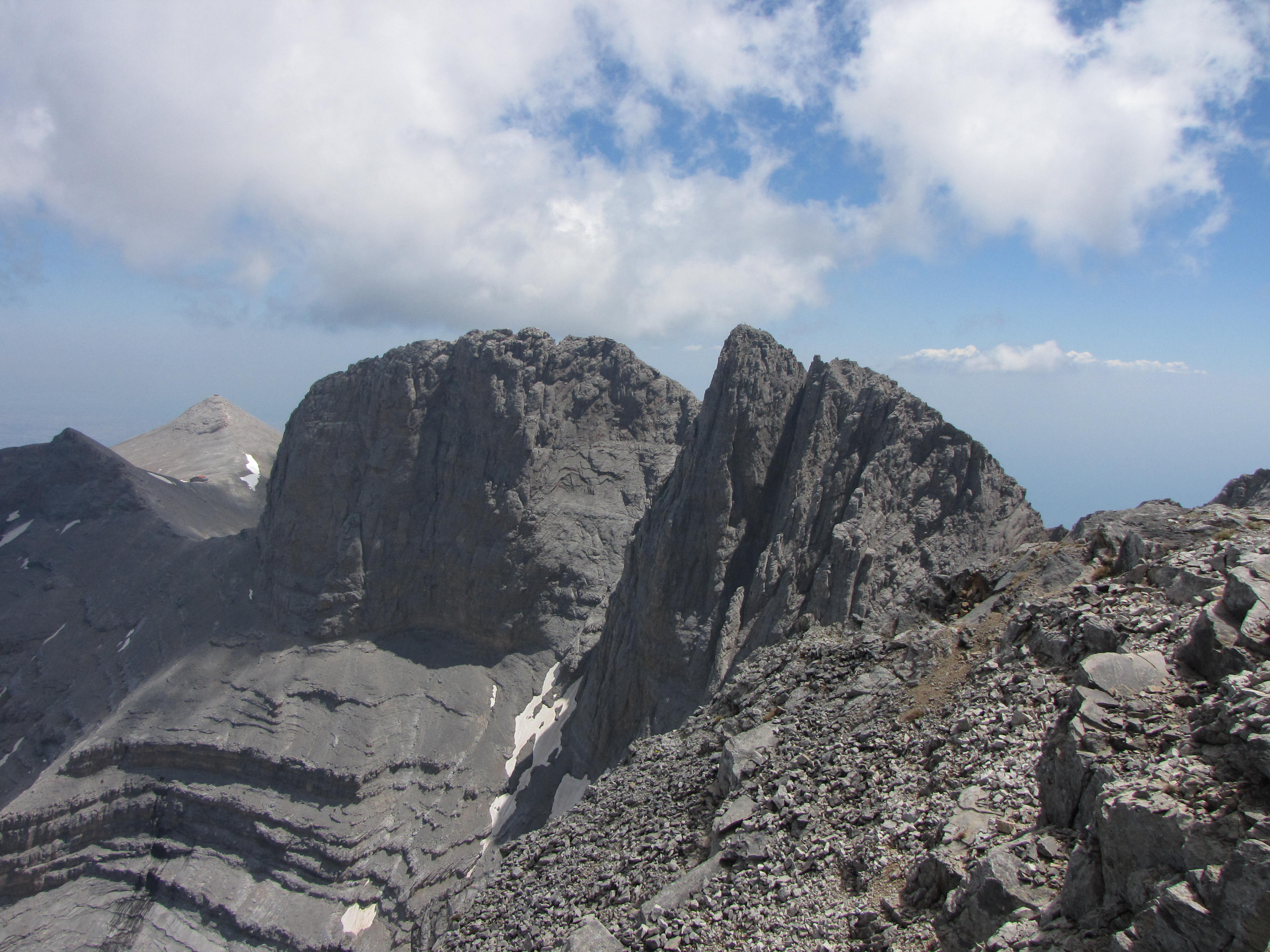
The summits of Mount Olympus. On the right is Mytikas (2917.727 m), on the left Stefani (2909 m)

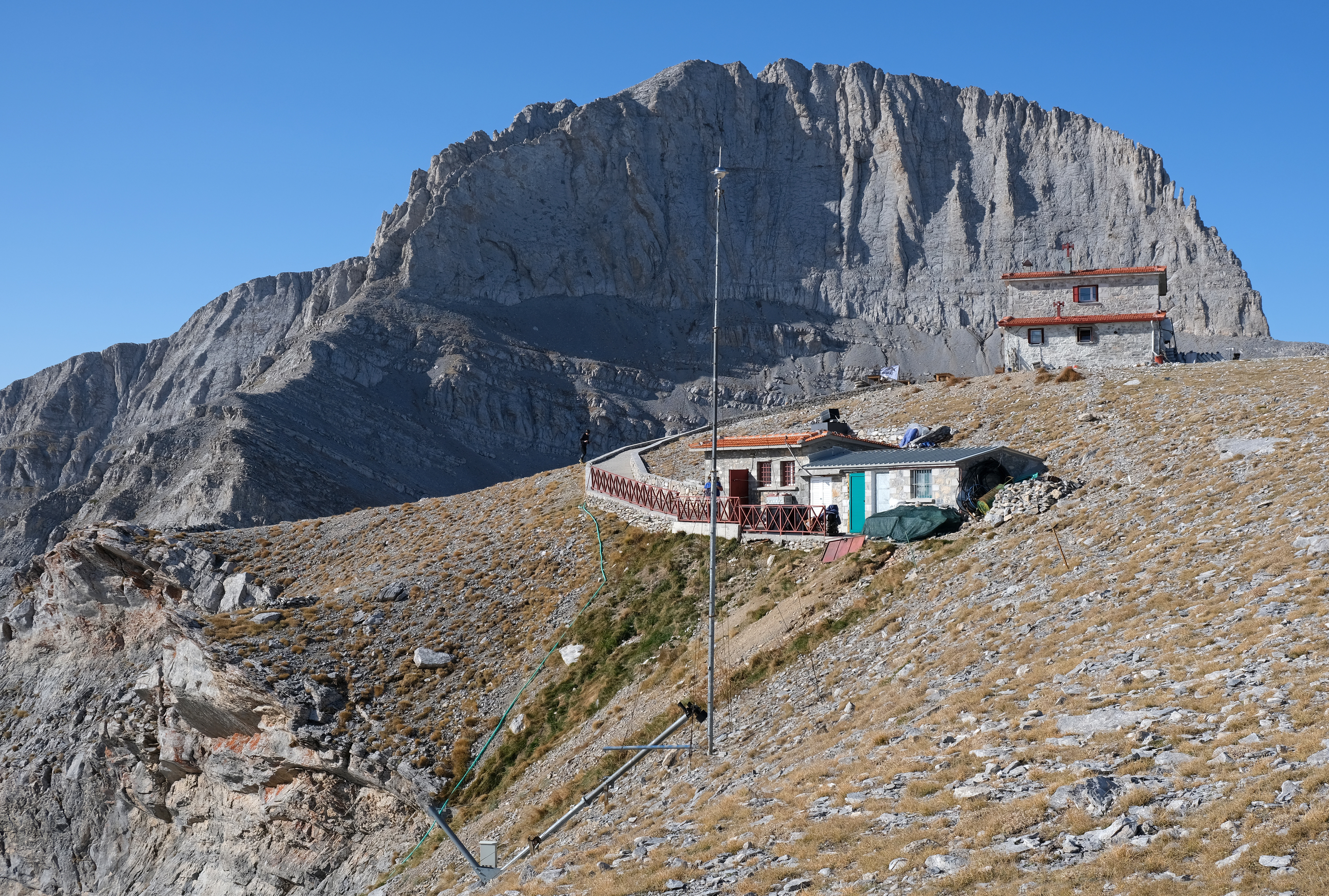
The "Plateau of the Muses" with the mountain hut named after Christos Kakkalos, in the background the Stefani summit (2909 m)

Christos Kakkalos (Greek: Χρήστος Κάκκαλος; 13 July 1882 – 12 April 1976) was a Greek mountain guide. He led the 1913 expedition of the Swiss Daniel Baud-Bovy and Frédéric Boissonnas and is considered the first climber to have ascended Mytikas, the highest peak of Mount Olympus (2917.727 m) in Greece.

== Life ==
Kakkalos was born in Litochoro, then part of the Ottoman Empire.

After three years of schooling he helped his family with work and hunting. The family Kakkalos owned a hut called Paliokalyva (Greek Παλαιοκάλυβα, old hut) on the east side of Mount Olympus. They worked as lumberjacks and transported the wood to the water-driven sawmills in Prionia. As a child, Kakkalos became acquainted with the mountains and hunted up to the summit region the Balkan chamois.

In the summer of 1913, he set out with the Swiss Baud-Bovy and Boissonnas to an expedition to the peaks of Mount Olympus and on 2 August 1913, the group succeeded in the first ascent of Mytikas. Further ascents were made in July 1919, 1921, and in September 1927 with 105 participants. In 1921 he led the Swiss topographer Marcel Kurz, who is considered the first-time climber of the Olympus summit Stefani (2909 m), and the Swiss engineer Fritz Kuhn. In 1931, he again led Daniel Baud-Bovy with a group of climbers.

Until 1932 he spent the nights with the groups he guided in Paliokalyva. In 1930, the foundation stone was laid for the first mountain hut of Mount Olympus, the "Spilios Agapitos" hut. In 1937 he was appointed by the Greek Mountaineering Association as the official guide for the mountain. He led climbers, geologists, botanists, ambassadors, politicians, artists and tourists. The last time he reached the summit was in 1973, when he was 91 years old.

Christos Kakkalos died on 12 April 1976.

In 1984, a mountain hut on the plateau of the Muses (2680 m) was named after him.

== The first ascent of Mytikas ==
On 28 July 1913, the Swiss Daniel Baud-Bovy and Frédéric Boissonnas reached the place Litochoro (about 400 m). They hired the lumberjacks Christos Kakkalos and Nikos Bistikos to lead them to the summit of Mount Olympus. The next day they started the ascent. At noon they reached the monastery of Agios Dionysios (820 m), went from there to Petrostrouga (1940 m) and stayed there overnight. On 30 July, they reached the Muses Plateau (about 2600 m) and climbed the peaks of Profitis Elias and Toumba. With the peaks of Mytikas and Stefani in mind, they decided to descend again and stayed in a log cabin (probably in the Paliokaliva) near today's mountain hut Spilios Agapitos (2040 m). On 31 July, they wanted to cancel their project and started their way back to Litochoro. During the descent, they changed their mind and stayed in Prionia (1100 m). On 1 August, they climbed back up to the lumberjack hut.

On the morning of 2 August 1913, the two Swiss, their guides and two shepherds, who were hired to carry the heavy photographic equipment, left the lumberjack hut for the summit region. It was raining, it was cold and foggy. On the way the two shepherds and the leader Nikos Bistikos stayed behind.

When the trio had climbed the supposed summit, they realized they had made a mistake when they saw the Mytikas above them. Kakkalos took the photo equipment and began the final ascent. A short time later, they climbed at 10.25 o'clock the summit of Mount Olympus.

== Literature ==
- Fred Boissonnas ΕΙΚΟΝΕΣ ΤΗΣ ΕΛΛΑΔΟΣ/IMAGES OF GREECE. Rizarios Foundation, Athens 2001, ISBN 960-85302-6-1. (Greek and German)
- Giannis Kiritsis Olympus, by Frédéric Boissonnas, Edition Dion-Olympus Municipality 2018, (Greek and English)
