= Daniel Baud-Bovy =

Swiss writer, art connoisseur and critic (1870-1958)

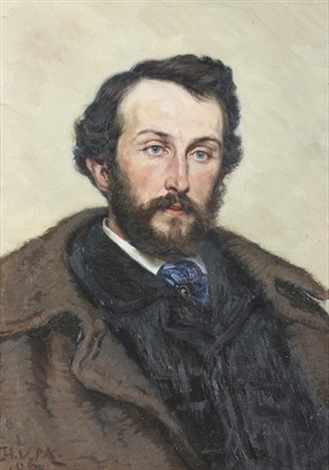
Portrait by Henri van Muyden, 1906

Daniel Baud-Bovy (3 April 1870, Geneva – 19 June 1958, Geneva) was a Swiss writer and art historian.

== Biography ==
Son of the painter Auguste Baud-Bovy, Daniel Baud-Bovy acquired most of his artistic and literary training in the symbolist milieu in Paris. Significant in the art world in Switzerland, he was curator of the Rath Museum, director of the school of fine arts in Geneva (from 1908 to 1919), president of the Federal Commission of fine arts, artistic correspondent of the Encyclopédique Review, poet, author of numerous novels, and short stories often illustrated by his painter friends and children's plays. He also published art criticism.

In 1896 he married Jeanne-Catherine Barth (1872–1928), pianist, and was the father of musician Samuel Baud-Bovy.

In 1913, he accomplished the first modern era ascent of Mount Olympus with guide Christos Kakkalos and his compatriot and long life friend Frédéric Boissonnas.

Baud-Bovy's second marriage, in 1933, was to Aline-Thékla Nachmann, née Mayer (1905–1982).

== Recognition ==
In Geneva, a street, as well as a park, bear his name, in the district of Plainpalais, which is in the immediate vicinity of a building of the University of Geneva.

== Publications ==
- Baud-Bovy, Daniel; Boissonnas, Frédéric (1915), L'Épire, berceau des Grecs, Geneva: F. Boissonnas et Cie
- Baud-Bovy, Daniel (1917), L'évasion : récit de deux prisonniers français évadés du camp d'Hammelbourg. Avec 8 illustrations et 3 cartes, Berger-Levrault
- Baud-Bovy, Daniel; Boissonnas, Frédéric (1919), Salonique, la ville des belles églises, F. Boissonnas
- Baud-Bovy, Daniel; Boissonnas, Frédéric; Hardy, Charles Frederick (tr.) (1920), In Greece: journeys by mountain and valley, Geneva: Éditions d'art F. Boissonnas
- Baud-Bovy, Daniel (1924), L'art rustique en Suisse, "The Studio" Ltd
- Baud-Bovy, Daniel (1935), Les maitres de la gravure suisse, A. Jullien
- Baud-Bovy, Daniel; Schweizerische Zentrale für Handelsförderung (1939), Switzerland land of peace and liberty, Swiss Office for the Development of trade
- Baud-Bovy, Daniel (1941), Nicolas Manuel, A. Skira
- Martin, Milo; Landry, Charles François (1941), Milo Martin, sculpteur, M. Blanc
- Baud-Bovy, Daniel; Gurtner, Othmar; Hilber, Paul (1890–1949); Loosli, Carl Albert (1877–1959) (1943), Hodler, ein zeitgenössisches Dokument. : Documents du temps de sa vie, Aare Verlag
- Baud-Bovy, Daniel (1957), Corot, A. Jullien
- Baud-Bovy, Daniel (1988), Peasant art in Switzerland, The Studio
- Kōnstantinidēs, Giannēs; Boissonnas, Frédéric; Baud-Bovy, Daniel (1989), Thessalonikē : 1913 + 1919, Laographiko kai Ethnologiko Mouseio Makedonias, Ekdoseis Diagōniou
- International Institute of Intellectual Co-operation; Italy. Commissione nazionale per la cooperazione intellettuale; Venice. Biennale d'arte. 1934 (1935), L'art et la réalité. : L'art et l'état, Société des nations, Institut international de coopération intellectuelle
- Hodler, Ferdinand; Geneva (Switzerland). Musée d'art et d'histoire (1940), Les Hodler au Musée d'art et d'histoire de Genève, Musée d'art et d'histoire

== Bibliography ==
- Monnier, Philippe M (1972), Daniel Baud-Bovy et Frédéric Boissonnas : un demi-siècle d'amitié au service de l'art. Conférence prononcée à l'Athénée le 22 février 1972, Société des arts

== Archive ==
- Private archives of individuals and families from the Library of Geneva: Baud-Bovy, family (19th–20th c.) Personal papers, papers of the Baud and Bovy families correspondence, works, papers, literary, miscellaneous, newspapers, collections of documents, photographs, sketchbooks, drawings. Personal records of Auguste (1848–1899), painter and Daniel Baud-Bovy (1870–1958), writer and art critic, director of the museum and the school of fine arts. – 26.3 m. Unpublished finding aids. – Research instruments published: MONNIER, Philippe M.,"The Baud-Bovy Archives at the Public and University Library". In Genava, n.s., t. XVIII / 1,1970. – Call number (s): Archives Baud-Bovy 1–302; not cataloged (1985/15; 2000/5; 2005/53)
