= Élisabeth Terroux =

Swiss artist (1759–1822)

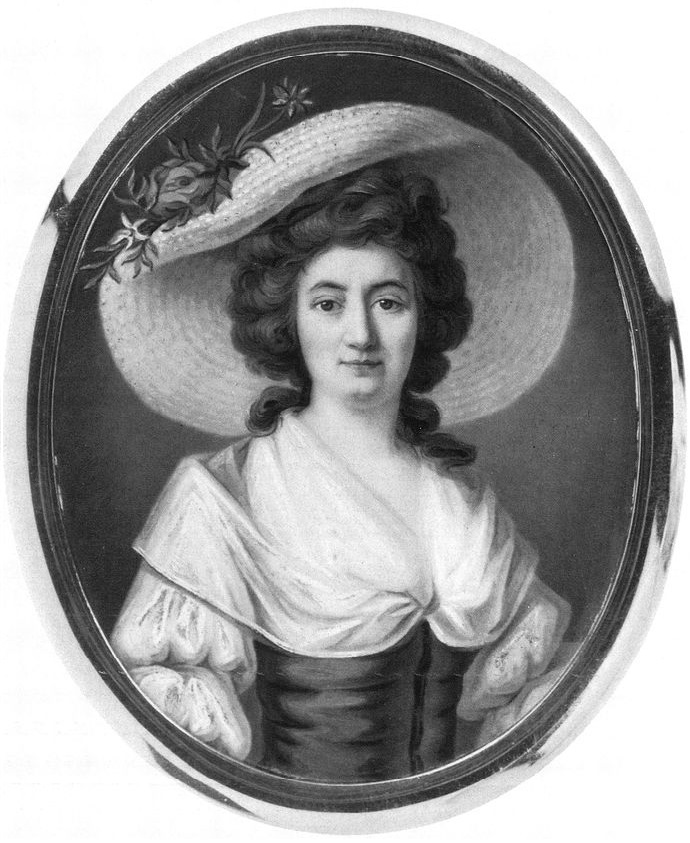
- Self-portrait, 1788
- Born: 25 July 1759; Geneva, Republic of Geneva
- Died: 1822 (aged 62–63); Geneva, Switzerland
- Citizenship: Genevan (1759–98, 1813–15); French (1798–1813); Swiss (1815–22)

Élisabeth Terroux (1759–1822) was a French-Swiss painter from the Republic of Geneva, active in Imperial Russia.

Terroux was born in Geneva and trained under Jean-François Favre. She became a popular miniature painter and travelled to Russia where she was active for Catherine II. Her self-portrait was shown at the 1878 Paris Exposition, in the exhibition Les Portraits nationaux at Trocadéro. She died in Geneva.
