= Frédéric Boissonnas =

Swiss photographer (1858-1946)

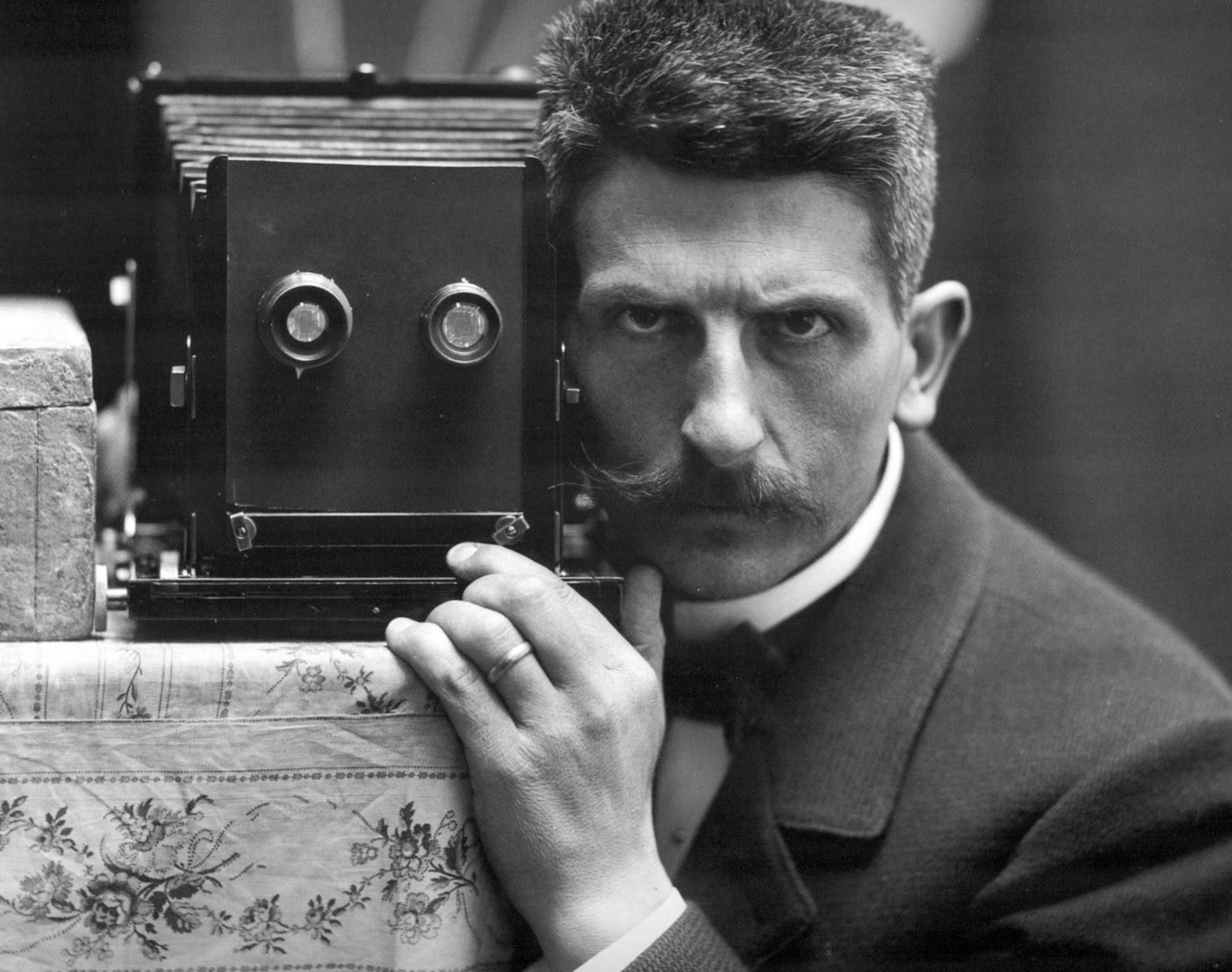
- Self-portrait in mirror, 1900
- Born: 18 June 1858; Geneva, Switzerland
- Died: 17 October 1946 (aged 88); Geneva, Switzerland
- Occupation: Photographer
- Spouse: Augusta Boissonnas
- Children: Edmond-Edouard Boissonnas, Henri-Paul Boissonnas, Emile Boissonnas, Louisa Boissonnas, Danielle Boissonnas, Paul Boissonnas, Geneviève Boissonnas
- Parent: Henri-Antoine Boissonnas
- Relatives: Edmond-Victor Boissonnas (brother)

François-Frédéric Boissonnas (18 June 1858 – 17 October 1946), known as Fred Boissonnas, was a Swiss photographer from Geneva. His work is considered crucial for the development of photography in Greece, and its use in favourably publicising the country's expansionist ambitions, during the early 20th century. Boissonnas constitutes a central figure in the transition from 19th century approaches to a more contemporary photography of antiquities.

== Biography ==
Boissonnas's father, Henri-Antoine (1833–1889), founded a photographic studio in Geneva in 1864 and took over Auguste Garcin's studio in Place de Bel-Air in 1865. In 1872, he settled with his family in a building at number 4 quai de la Poste.

Frédéric ran the family studio from 1887 to 1920. He had seven children, including Edmond-Edouard (1891–1924), Emile-Albert (1893-1988), Henri-Paul (1894–1966) and Paul (1902–1983). In 1901, he went into partnership with André Taponier to create a studio in Paris, at number 12 rue de la Paix.

== Greece ==
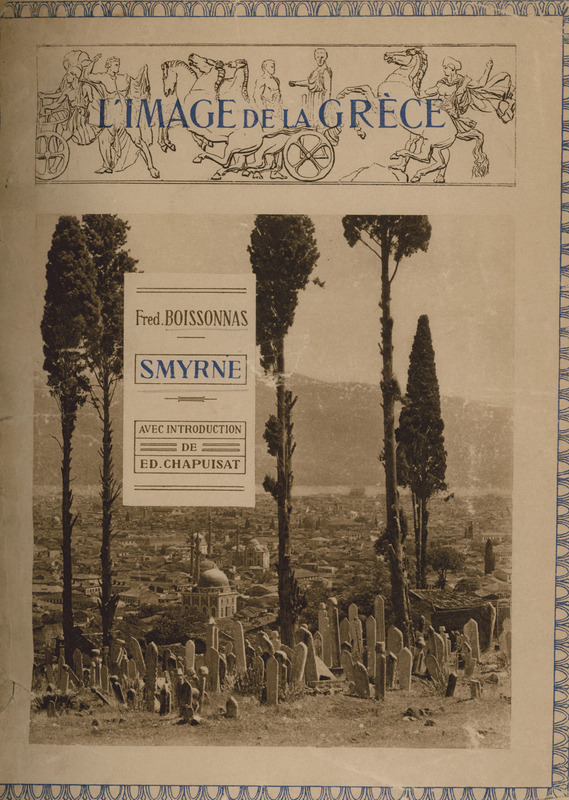
Frédéric Boissonnas (1919) Title page of L'Image de la Grèce

Between 1903 and 1933 Boissonnas made several trips to Greece where he systematically documented Greece in landscape photographs, taken in all corners of the country reflecting its continuity from ancient times to the present day. He travelled to the Peloponnese, Epirus, Crete, the islands, Ithaca, Mount Athos, etc. On one Greek expedition with compatriot art historian Daniel Baud-Bovy, Boissonnas made the first recorded modern-era ascent of Mount Olympus on 2 August 1913, aided by a hunter of wild goats from Litochoro, Christos Kakkalos.

In total, Boissonnas published 14 photo albums dedicated to Greece, many of which belong to the thematic series entitled L'image de la Grece ('The Image of Greece'), his imagery contributing decisively to the identity of Greece in Europe; its promotion as a tourist destination but also its political situation. His photographs of archaeological sites form 20% of his total Greek series. He visited The Acropolis, Delphi, Olympia, Dodoni, Knossos, Delos and many other sites, providing an extensive iconographic panorama of classical Greek antiquities. In 1923 Le Courbusier used Boissonnas' photographs of the Parthenon in his book Vers un architecture.

Daniel Baud-Bovy wrote of other ambitions of their collaboration on these publications;

"For many years, Greece was considered as one of these dead stars, whose rays, reach us through the centuries past. One has to blame the archaeologists, or the art historians. They saw nothing but the ruins ... our plan was to deal not only with the brilliance of the ancient monuments, but also to relive the landscapes that surround them, the people, who are their everyday witnesses."

Interested not only in documenting a site, Boissonnas also aimed to interpret the Greek landscape in combining classical antiquity with the provincial Greek folklore through associations of natural and cultural elements carefully composed and in the best ambient light. Incidentally he took five hundred photographs of the automatic dances of a young woman known as 'Magdeleine G' at the Parthenon in antique costume, commissioned to illustrate the hypnotist Émile Magnin's book L’Art et l’Hypnose, and later admired by the Surrealists. His last photo-album about Greece published in 1933 was titled 'Following the ship of Ulysses' that sought to reconstruct the epic and, in a symbolic way, the dissemination of Greek culture throughout Europe. The photographs were accompanied by excerpts from Homer's Odyssey.

== Government commissions ==
As Irini Boudouri has shown, in addition to being an adept craftsman, Boissonnas was a canny businessman, who persuaded the Greek state authorities that his photographs would enhance the country's political, commercial and touristic image abroad. Boissonnas contributed his professional photography, and the services of the family printing firm "Boissonnas SA" that he founded in 1919, to the expansionist ambitions of the Greek state. He had already secured a small grant for the purpose from King George I in 1907, but gained substantial sponsorship in 1913 for the purpose of photographing and publishing imagery of the newly acquired territories of Epirus and Macedonia. He had an exhibition Visions of Greece in Paris over February–March 1919 of 550 of his photographs, accompanied by a 260-page illustrated volume (published by the family firm), at which Edouard Chapuisat, editor-in-chief of the Journal de Genève, announced: "Today, all eyes are turned upon Greece, which aspires to regain that place in the East which she occupied so many centuries ago. The support of faithful allies anticipates the hour when Greece, which has given the world the purest jewels of civilisation, will contribute to the reconstruction of Europe on the very borders of the East."

In the aftermath of World War I, Greece attempted further expansion into Asia Minor, seeking to take advantage of the dissolution of the former Ottoman Empire where it laid claim to regions that were populated by Greeks, but was defeated in the Greco-Turkish War of 1919–1922. During the long drawn-out peace negotiations, a new contract was drawn up whereby Frederic and his sons undertook the publication between 1920 and 1926 of a number of illustrated books, volumes with titles Smyrna, Thrace, Constantinople and The Greek Presence in Asia Minor, the text of which, he reported to the Greek government, "quite apart from the high artistic quality of the illustrations - reaffirms in the most categorical way the legitimacy of [Greek] claims over these contested regions." La Campagne d'Epire and its companion, La Campagne de Macedoine published 1920-21 both included his photographs and texts by Fernand Feyler, a retired Swiss colonel and military historian.

After the defeat of Venizelos in the elections of November 1920 and the country's increasing diplomatic isolation after the advance into western Asia Minor the Foreign Ministry's Press Bureau worked to ensure positive coverage in the international press. Frédéric's son Henri-Paul, with Feyler, were contracted to cover the campaign; Henri-Paul would provide the Greek government with photographs, as well as placing some in the Swiss press, while Feyler undertook to publish articles in the Journal de Genève and also to publish a book about the campaign and on 'the rights of Hellenism in Asia Minor'. Henri-Paul placed at least 800 photos with the international press, and the Greek ministry paid the newspapers Le Matin, Le Journal, L'Écho de Paris and Le Petit Parisien 100,000 francs each during the course of 1921, committing the newspapers to "refrain from publishing anything which would adversely affect our interests [ ... ] and furthermore, to publish the reports and bulletins with which we will supply them."

== Egypt ==
Boissonnas was invited to Egypt by King Fuad I in 1929 to work on a major book commission and he returned in 1933 to embark on a photographic expedition to Sinai. Following the route of the Israelites as recorded in the Book of Exodus, he photographed the traditional biblical sites that he encountered on his journey. The outcome was the book, Égypte, which set complex histories as a background to the ‘modern’ state newly formed in Britain's unilateral declaration of Egyptian independence on 28 February 1922 and Fuad's own monarchical role in 1922 and the Egyptian Parliament's Constitution of 1923. A second expedition that he prepared with extensive research on Sinai in the Geneva public library's books on archaeology, Biblical scholarship and literature, as well as early travel guides, was to be published as Au Sinaï, a quasi-scientific, cultural and very personal document; the culmination of a lifetime's study of the ancient civilizations of the Mediterranean. However, it remained unfinished at the time of the photographer's death in 1946.

== Family enterprise ==
Frédéric Boissonnas' eldest son, Edmond-Edouard, succeeded him at the head of the studio in 1920, but died suddenly in 1924. Frédéric's third son, Henri-Paul, ran the studio from 1924 to 1927, at which point he devoted himself to art restoration. The fourth son, Paul (1902-1983), ran the studio until 1969, when he entrusted it to his son-in-law, Gad Borel (1942) under whom Sabine Weiss was an apprentice between 1942 and 1949.

The studio closed in 1990.

== Publications ==
- Atakişi, Tufan; Boissonnas, Frédéric, (photographer.); Boissonnas, Henri-Paul, (photographer.); Boissonnas, Edmond, (photographer.) (2015), Fred, Edmond, Hanri Boissonnas ve İzmir (1. basım ed.), İzmir Atadost Yayınları, ISBN 978-975-8501-39-7
- Boissonnas, Frédéric; Baddeley, Oriana, 1954-; Orthodoxon Kentron tou Oikoumenikou Patriarcheiou (Chambésy, Switzerland); Musée d'art chrétien du Partriarcat œcuménique (2011), Les expeditions de Sinai de Fred Boissonnas: 1929-1933, Musée d'art chrétien, ISBN 978-0-9558628-2-3
- Collignon, Maxime; Boissonnas, Frédéric; Mansell, W.A. & Co (1913), Le Parthénon; l'histoire, l'architecture et la sculpture, C. Eggimann
- Thibaudet, Albert; Boissonnas, Frédéric; Ligaran (30 August 2016), L'Acropole : Illustré de quarante-sept photographies de Fred Boissonnas, Primento Digital Publishing (published 2016), ISBN 978-2-335-16969-0
- Fatio, Guillaume; Boissonnas, Frédéric (1981), La campagne genevoise d'après nature, Slatkine, ISBN 978-2-05-100250-9
- Boissonnas, Frédéric; Baud-Bovy, Daniel (1919), Salonique, la ville des belles églises, F. Boissonnas
- Boissonnas, Frédéric; Baud-Bovy, Daniel (1915), L'Épire, berceau des Grecs, F. Boissonnas et Cie
- Baud-Bovy, Daniel; Hardy, Charles Frederick; Boissonnas, Frédéric (1920), In Greece : journeys by mountain and valley, Éditions d'art F. Boissonnas
- Bérard, Victor; Boissonnas, Frédéric, (ill.) (1973), Dans le sillage d'Ulysse, A. Colin
- Roussel, Pierre; Boissonnas, Frédéric (1925), Délos, Société d'édition "Les Belles lettres,"
- Kōnstantinidēs, Giannēs; Boissonnas, Frédéric; Baud-Bovy, Daniel (1989), Thessalonikē : 1913 + 1919, Laographiko kai Ethnologiko Mouseio Makedonias, Ekdoseis Diagōniou

== Bibliography ==
- Fröbe, Turit; Öbe, Turit (5 December 2016), Die Inszenierung eines Mythos : Le Corbusier und die Akropolis, Bauverlag Gütersloh (published 2017), ISBN 978-3-0356-0913-4
- Bouvier, Nicolas (2010), Les Boissonnas : histoire d'une dynastie de photographes [The Boissonnas : history of a photographers' dynasty, 1864-1983] (in French), Genève: Héros-Limite, p. 220, ISBN 978-2-940358-51-9
- Monnier, Philippe M (1972), Daniel Baud-Bovy et Frédéric Boissonnas : un demi-siècle d'amitié au service de l'art. Conférence prononcée à l'Athénée le 22 février 1972, Société des arts
- Sohier Estelle, Crispini Nicolas, ed. (2013), Usages du monde, et de la photographie : Fred Boissonnas [Uses of the world, and of photography : Fred Boissonnas] (in French), Chêne-Bourg: Georg, p. 246, ISBN 978-2-8257-1019-7
- Sohier, Estelle (2020), Fred Boissonnas et la Méditerranée : une odyssée photographique [Fred Boissonnas and the Mediterranean : a photographic Odyssey] (in French), Paris: La Martinière, p. 189, ISBN 978-2732488462

== Gallery ==
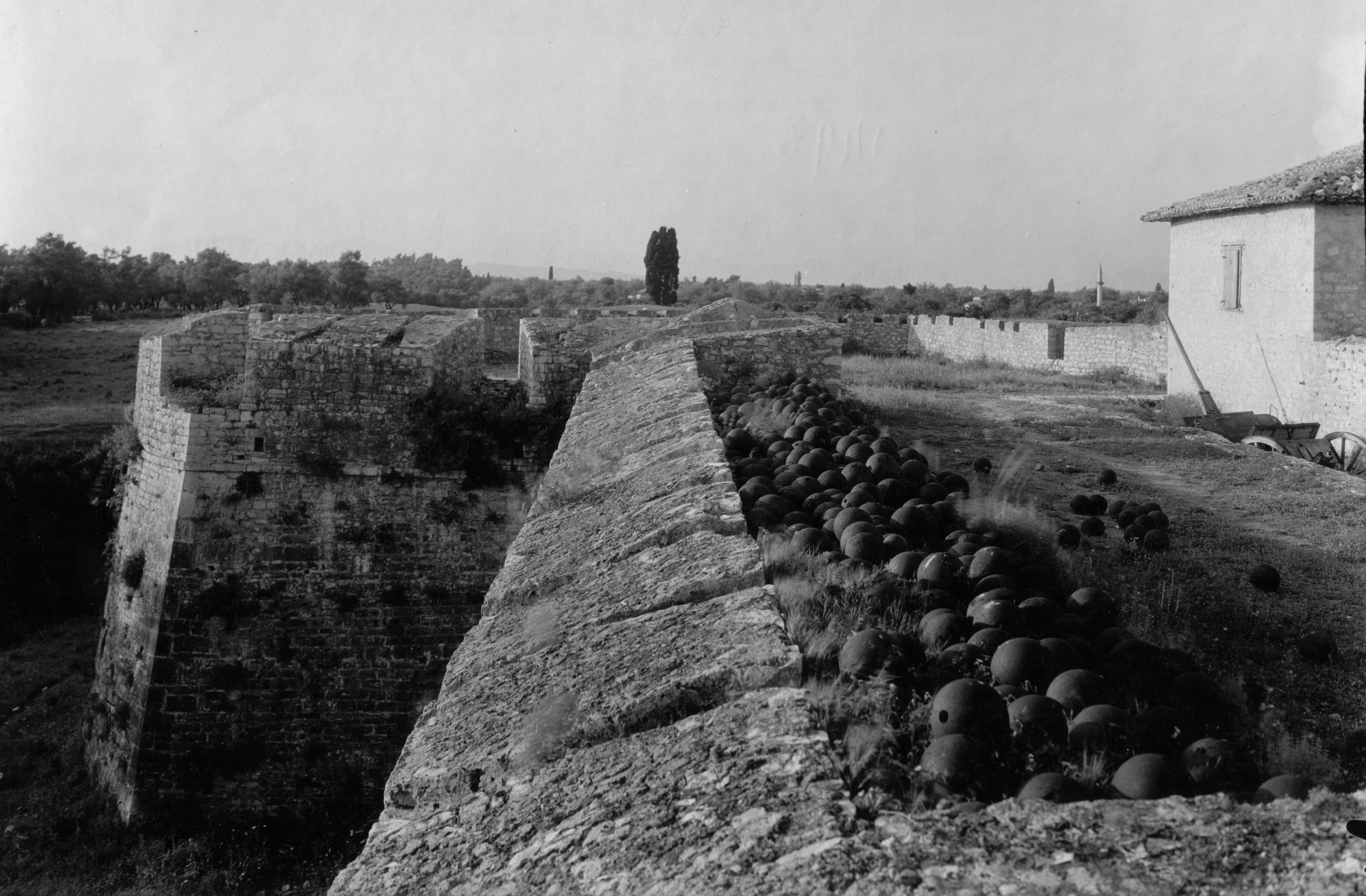
St Georges Castle Preveza Boissonnas 1913

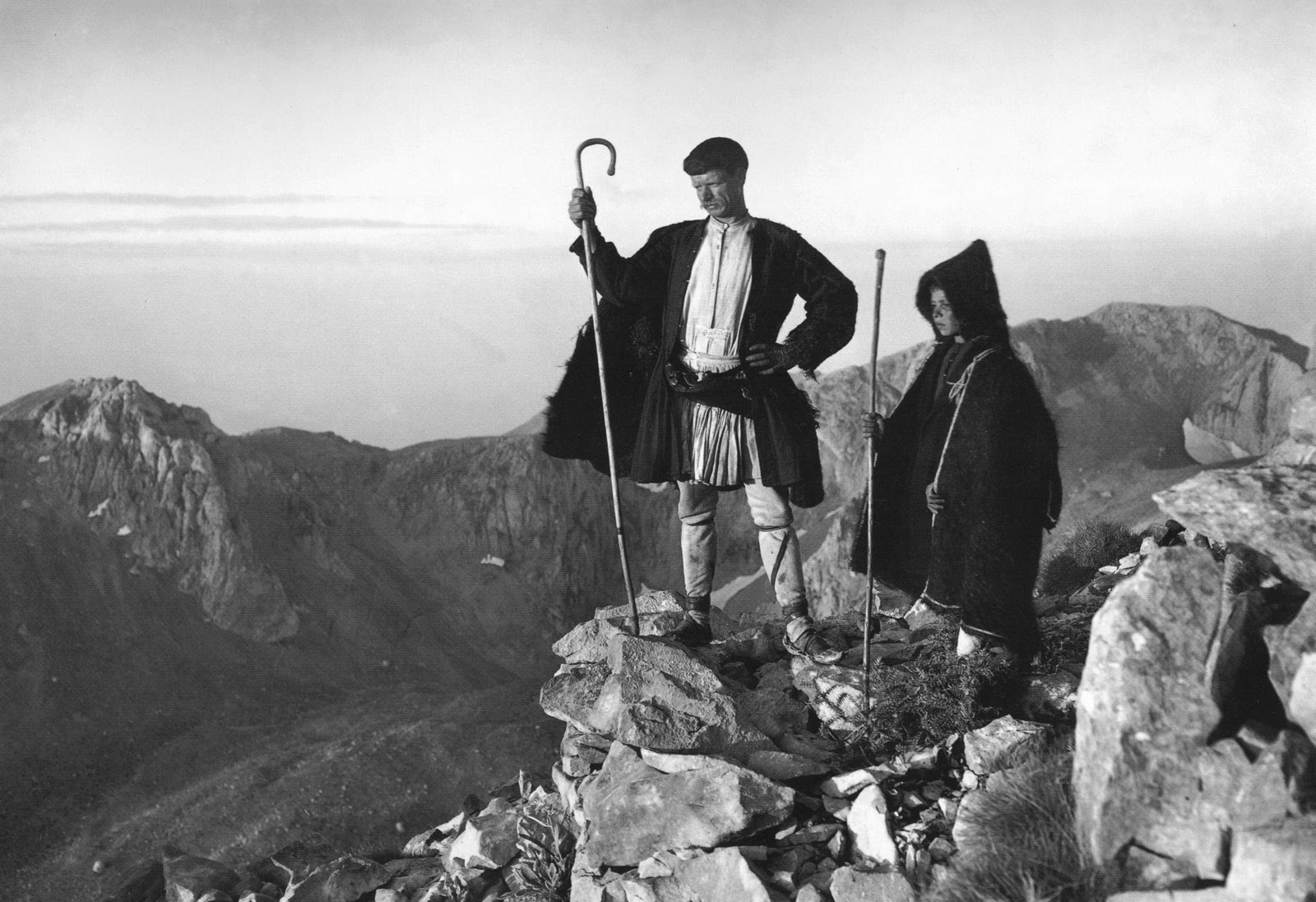
Frédéric Boissonnas (1903) Parnassos shepherds, Attica

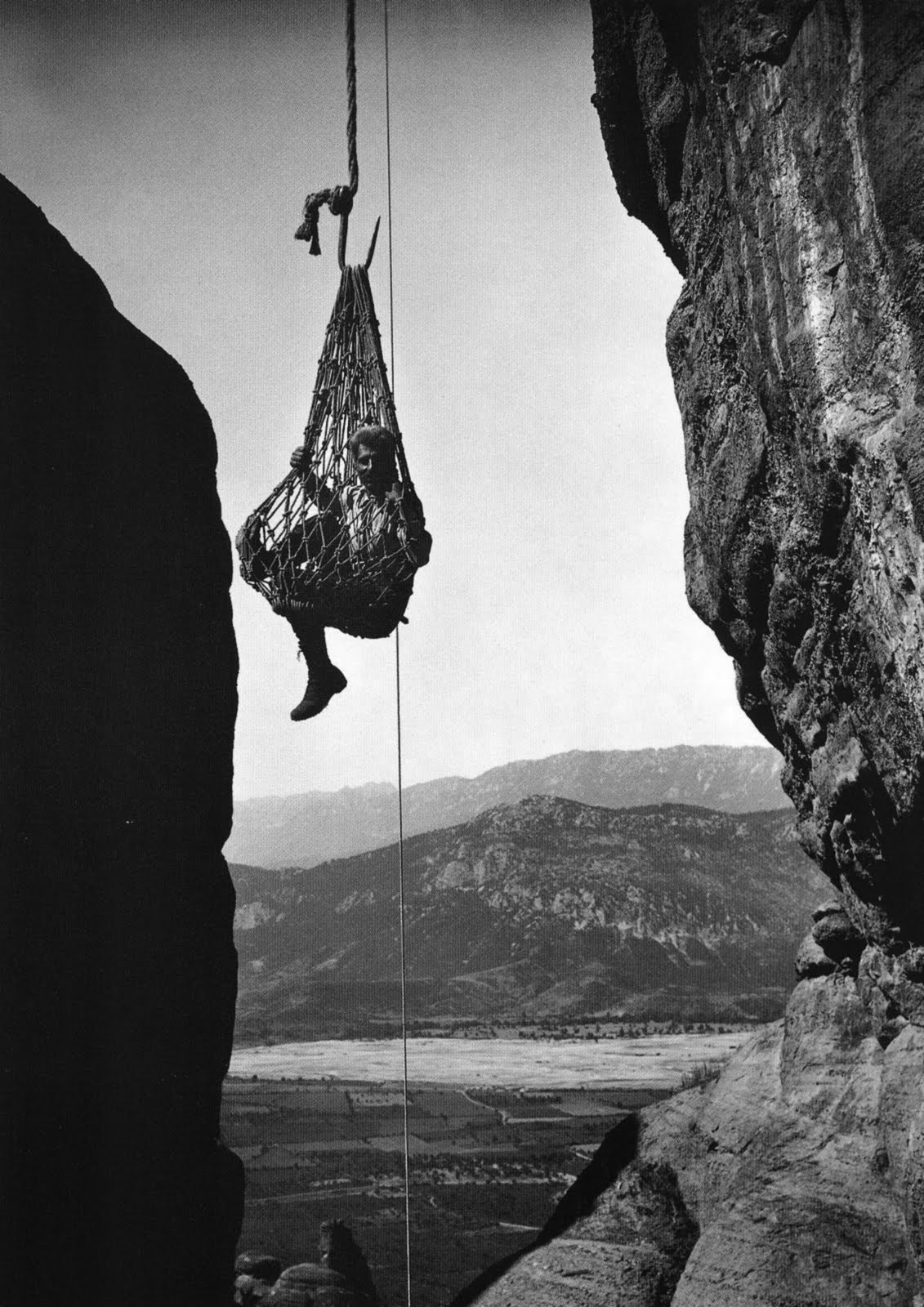
Frédéric Boissonnas (1908) Meteora net lift, Greece

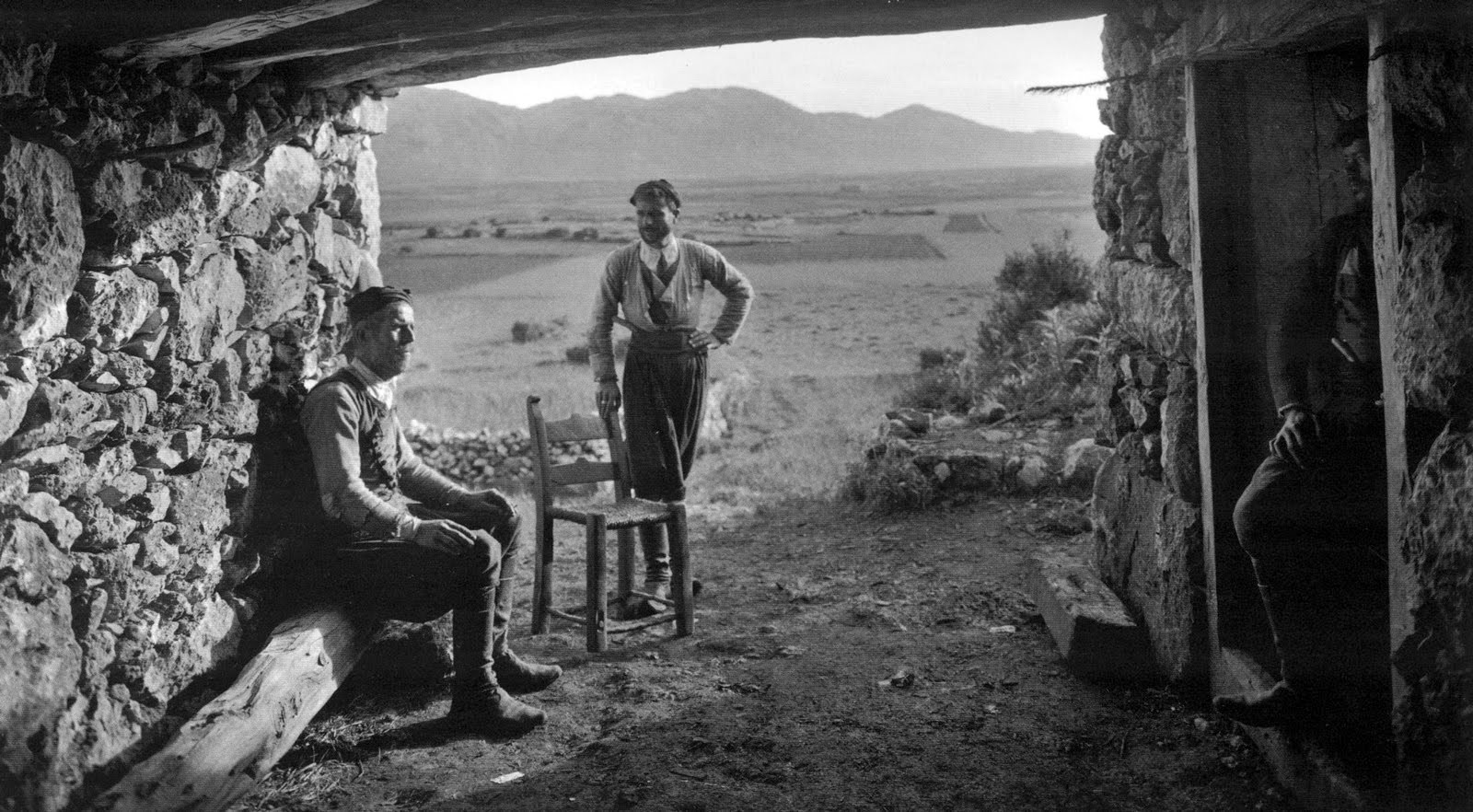
Frédéric Boissonnas (1911) Omalos villagers, Crete

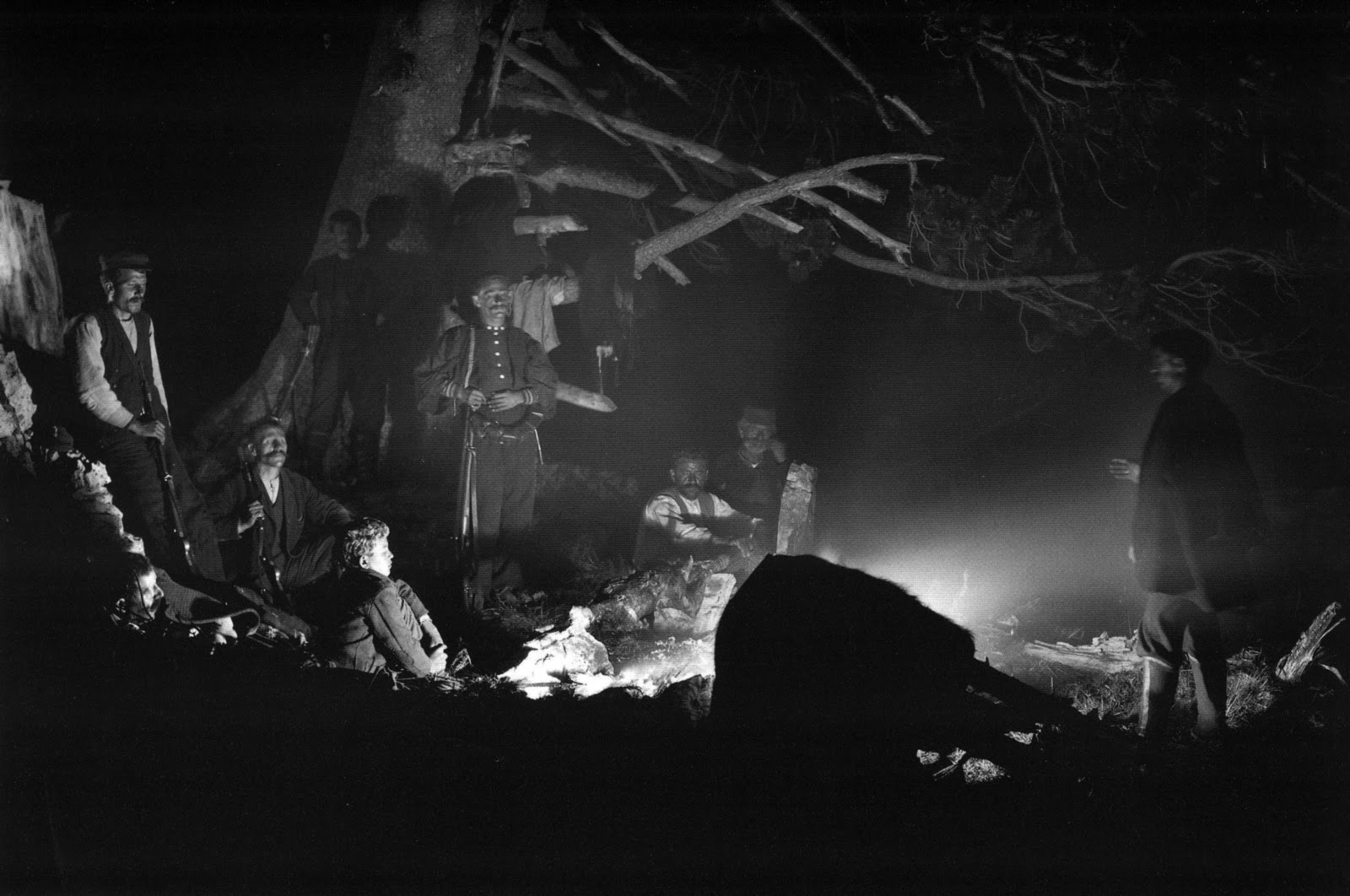
Frédéric Boissonnas (1914) Mount Olympus shepherds, Greece

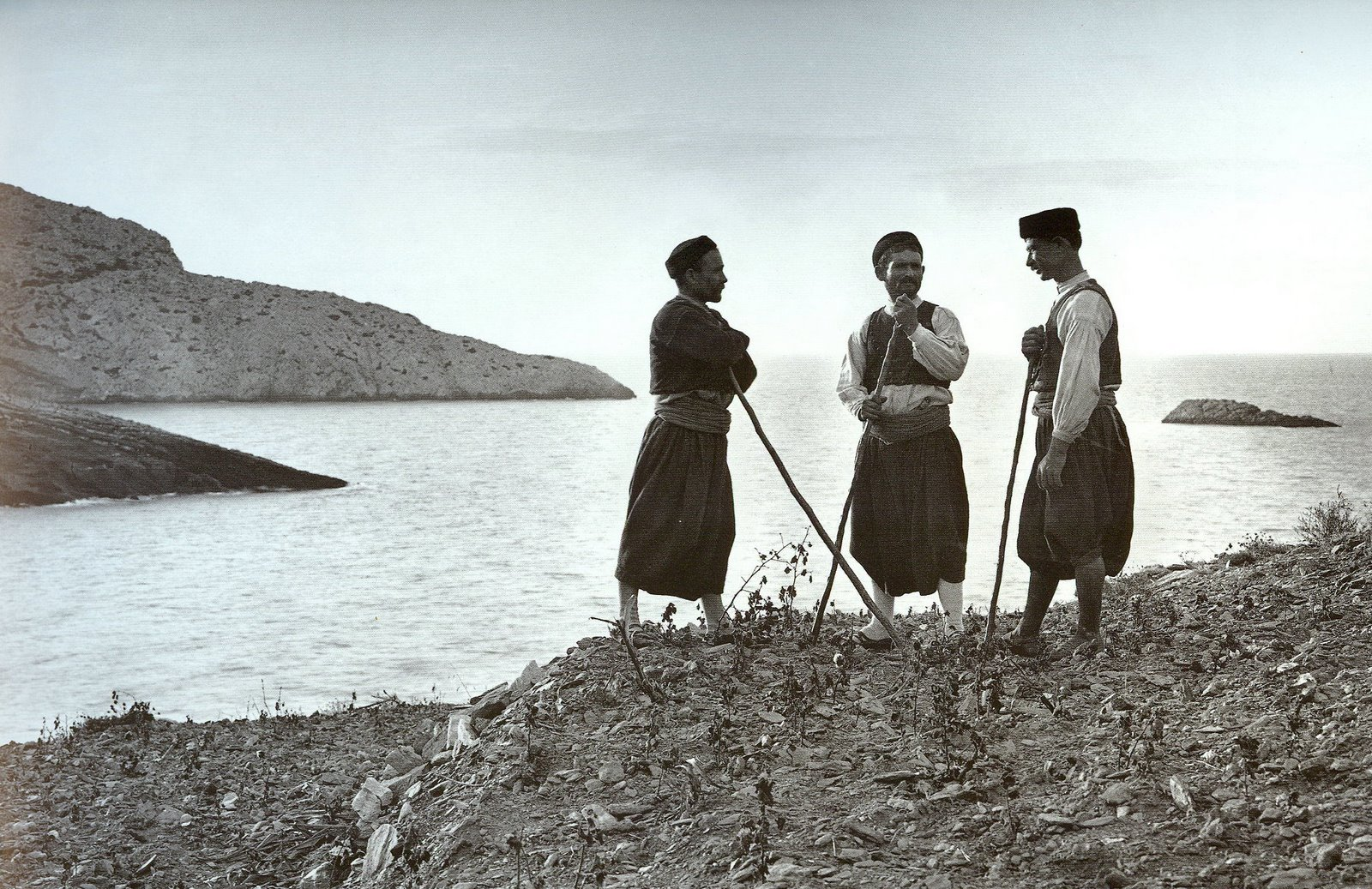
Fred Boissonnas (1918) Greece

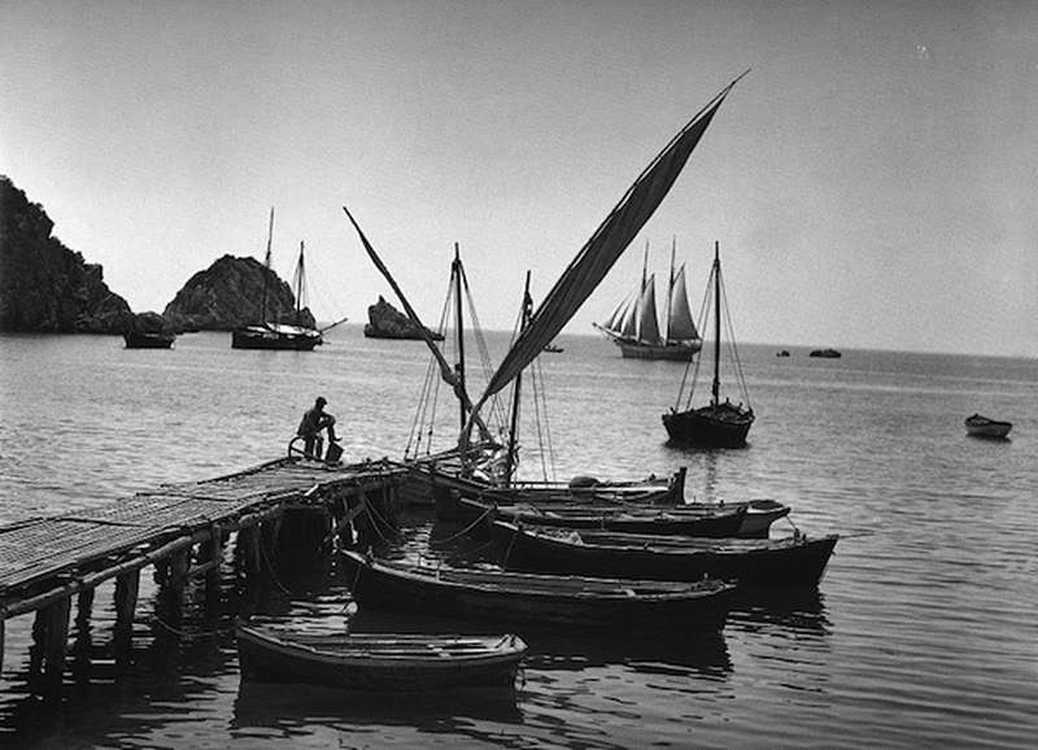
Fred Boissonnas (1913) The port of Parga

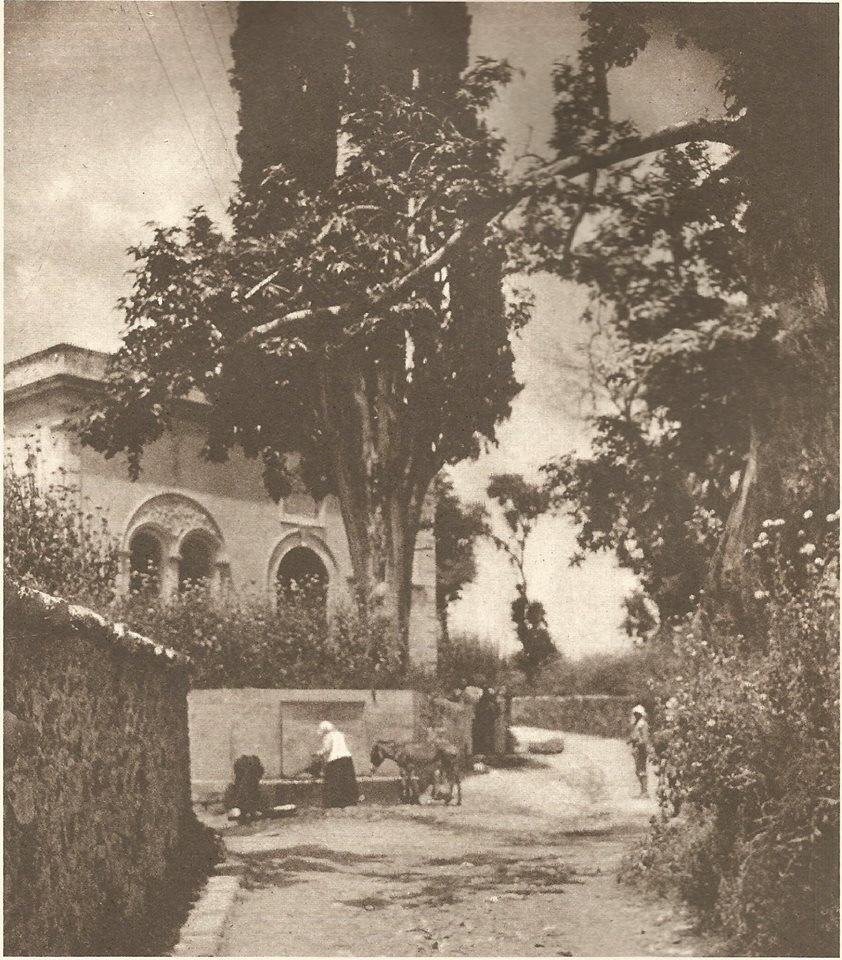
Frédéric Boissonnas Tomb of Evrenos in Giannitsa

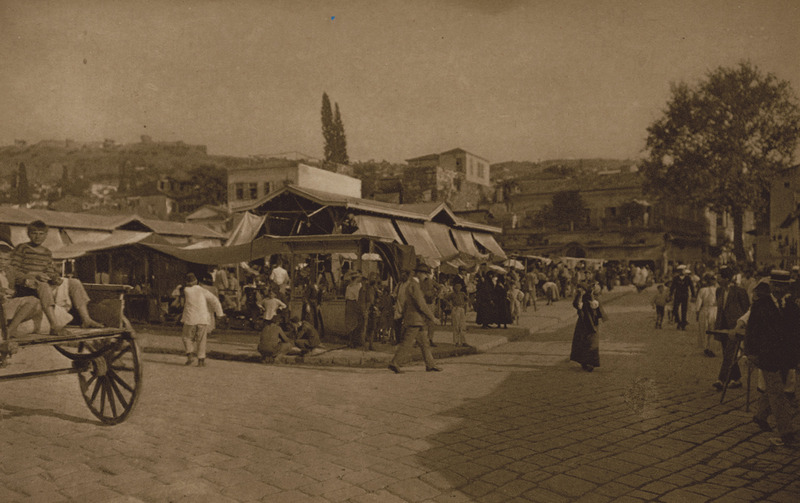
Frédéric Boissonnas (1919) Market

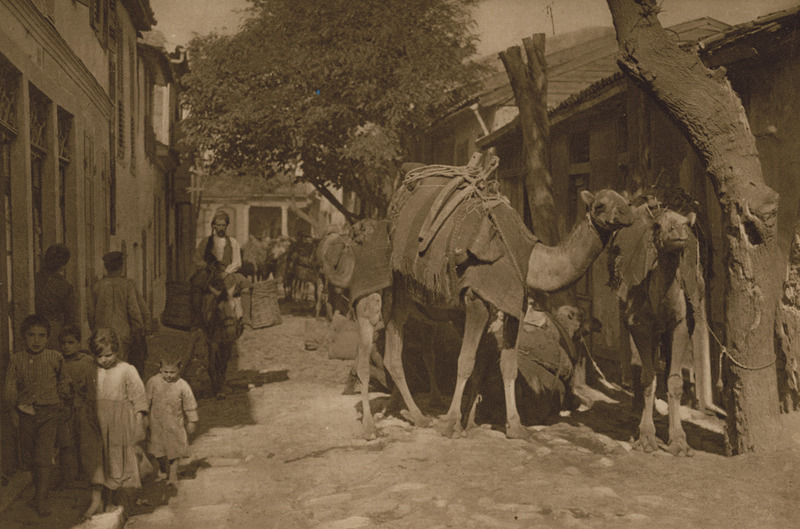
Frédéric Boissonnas (1919) Quartier marchand du centre

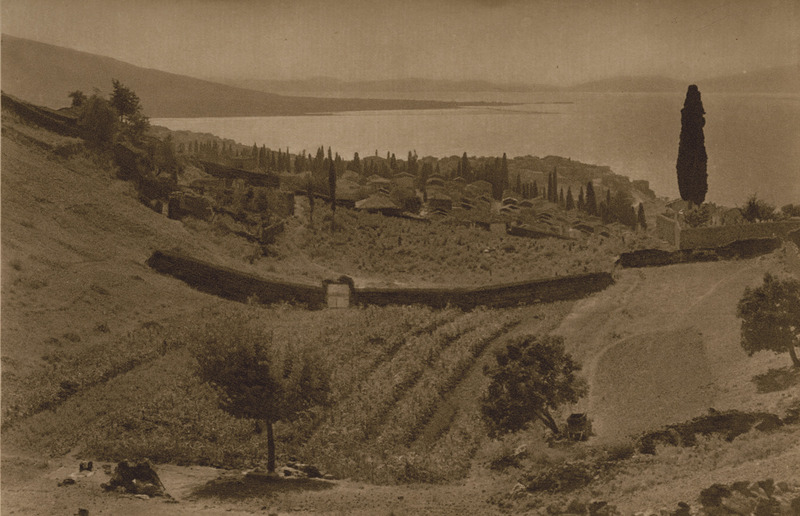
Frédéric Boissonnas (1919) Le golfe de Smyrne

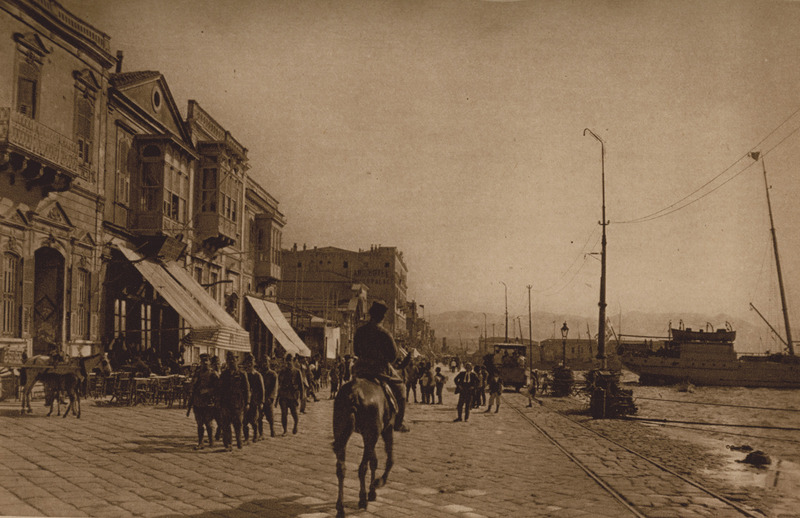
Frédéric Boissonnas (1919) Les Quais

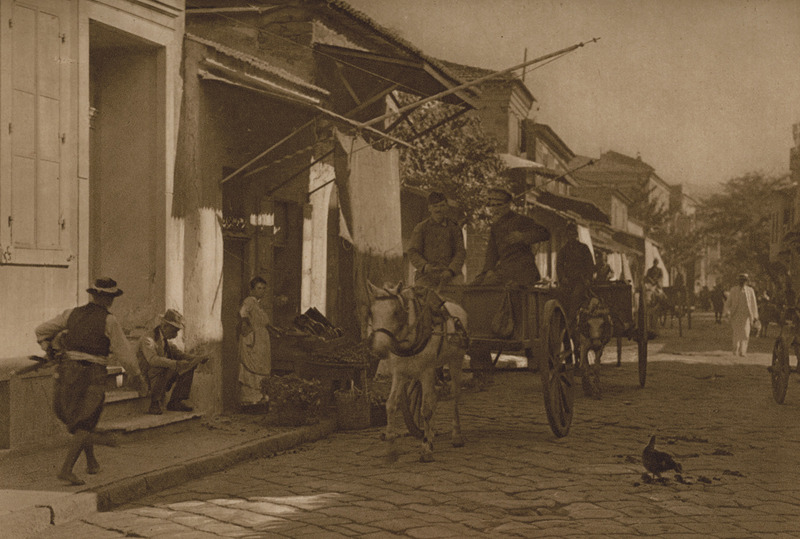
Frédéric Boissonnas (1919) Dans le quartier du centre

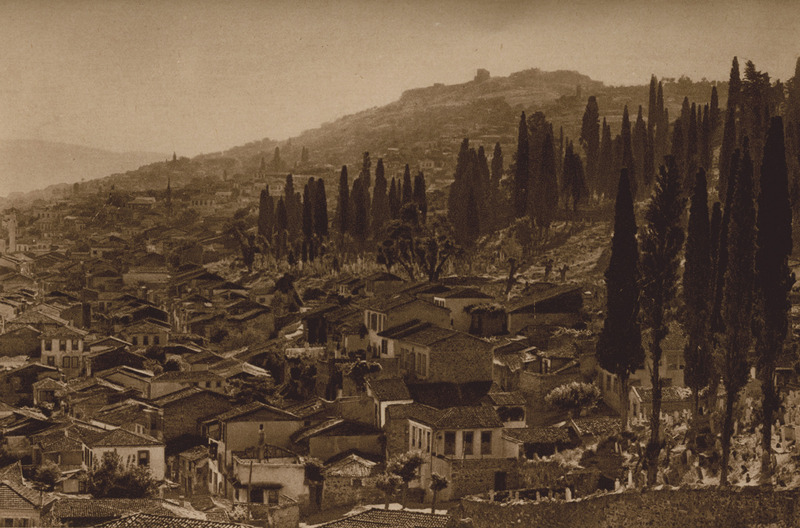
Frédéric Boissonnas (1919) Le Quartier et les cimetières Turcs

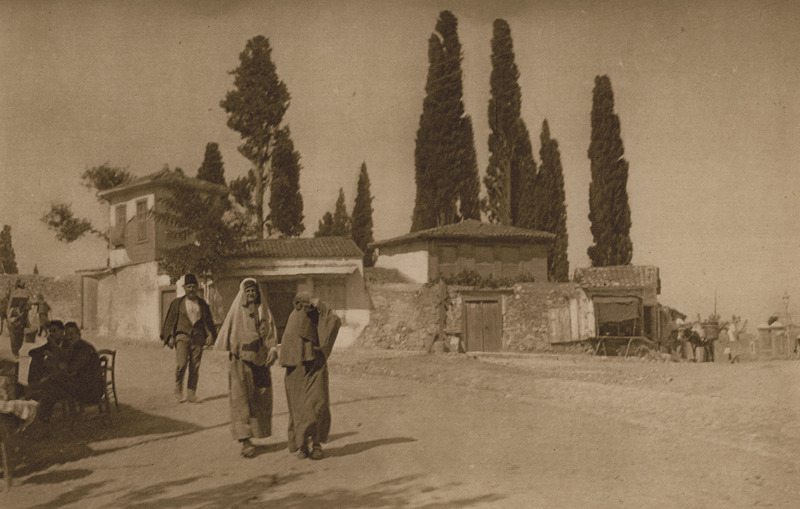
Frédéric Boissonnas (1919) Dans le haut quartier Turc

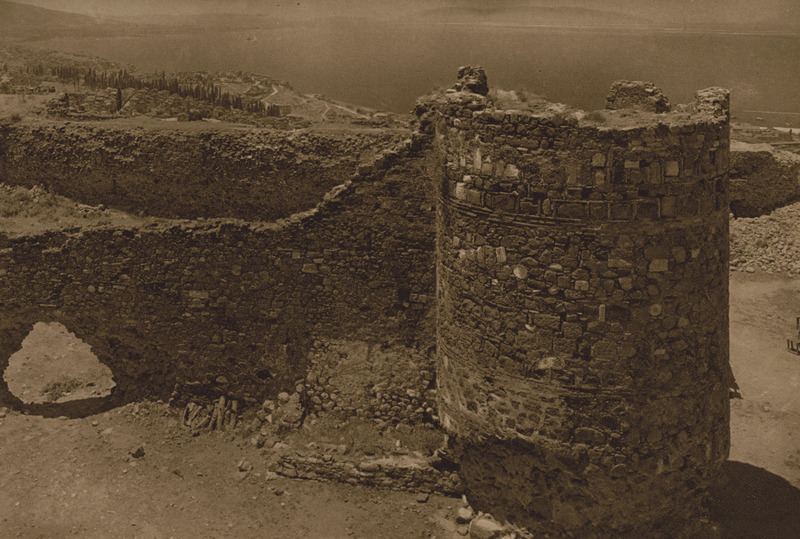
Frédéric Boissonnas (1919) La forteresse du mont Pagus

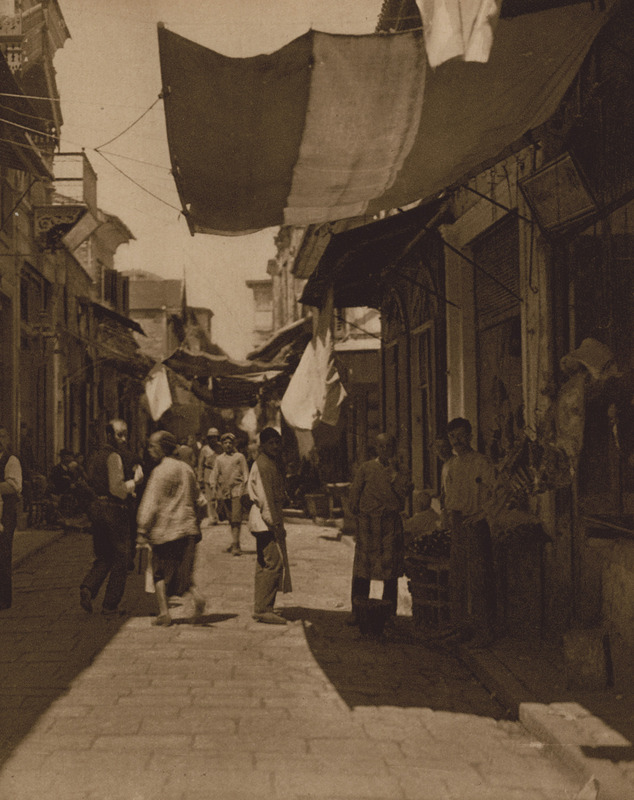
Frédéric Boissonnas (1919) Une rue du Bazar

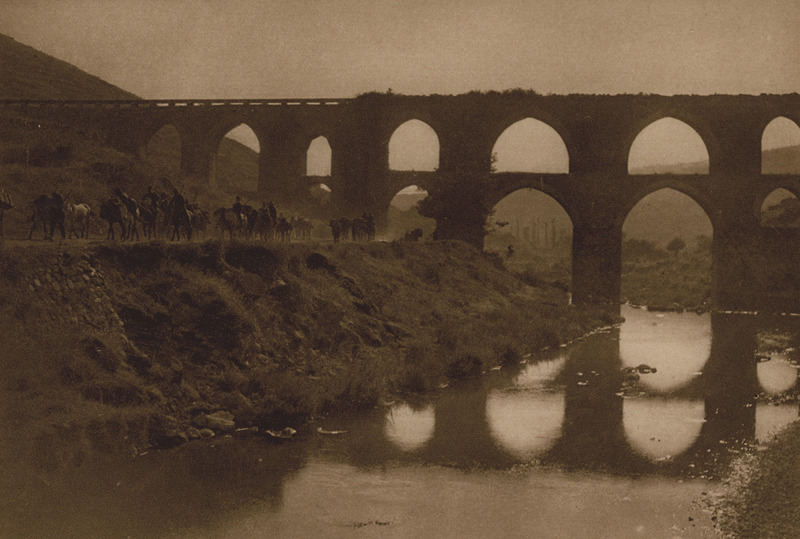
Frédéric Boissonnas (1919) Le petit aqueduc, au prophète Élie
