= Musée Rath =

Art museum in Geneva, Switzerland

Coordinates: 46°12′06″N 6°08′37″E

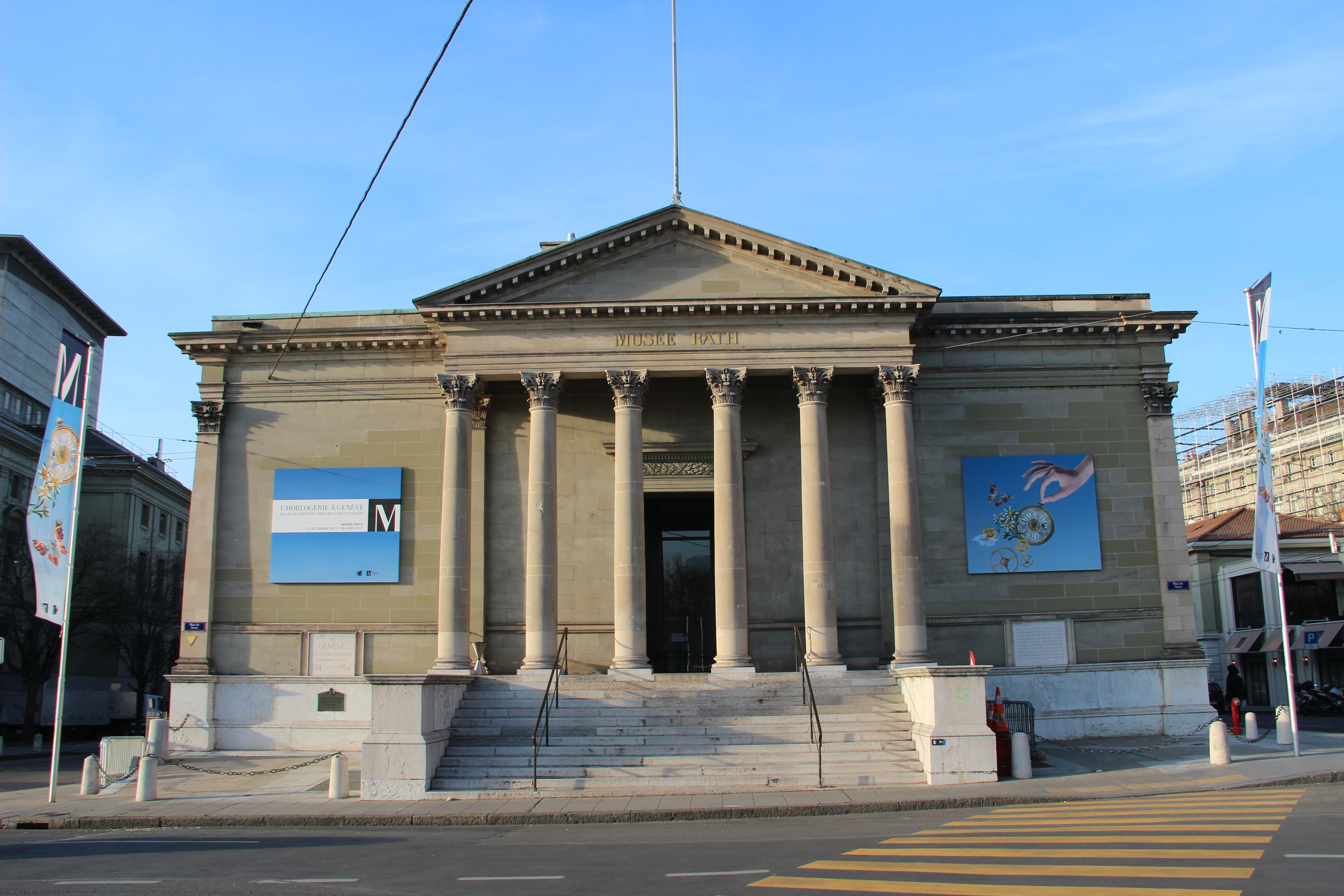
Entrance to the Musée Rath

The Musée Rath is an art museum in Geneva, used exclusively for temporary exhibitions. Its building is the oldest purpose-built art museum in Switzerland, and the original home of Geneva's Musée d'Art et d'Histoire.

It is located on Place Neuve, in front of the old city walls, next to the Grand Théâtre and near the Conservatoire de Musique.

== History ==
The museum was built between 1824 and 1826 by the architect Samuel Vaucher on behalf of the Société des arts. It was partly paid for with funds that General Simon Rath (1766–1819) had bequeathed to his sisters, Jeanne-Françoise and Henriette Rath, for such a purpose; the remainder was paid by the state of Geneva. Vaucher designed the building as a temple of the muses, inspired by Ancient Greek temples.

From 1826 to 1872, the school École Supérieure des Beaux-Arts, Genève was located in the basement of the Musée Rath.

At first the museum was used for both permanent and temporary exhibitions, as well as art teaching and as a cultural meeting place. By 1880 it had become too small for its collections. Since the opening of the larger Musée d'Art et d'Histoire in 1910, the Musée Rath has been devoted to temporary exhibitions of Swiss and international art, and archaeology.

Between 1916 and 1919 the museum was closed and the building was used for the Red Cross's International Prisoners-of-War Agency.

The museum has been owned by the city of Geneva since 1851. The building has been under cultural heritage management since 1921.

== See also ==
- List of art museums
- List of museums in Switzerland
